

167001–167100 

|-bgcolor=#fefefe
| 167001 ||  || — || August 1, 2003 || Socorro || LINEAR || V || align=right | 1.4 km || 
|-id=002 bgcolor=#fefefe
| 167002 ||  || — || August 1, 2003 || Haleakala || NEAT || — || align=right | 1.2 km || 
|-id=003 bgcolor=#fefefe
| 167003 ||  || — || August 2, 2003 || Haleakala || NEAT || V || align=right | 1.1 km || 
|-id=004 bgcolor=#fefefe
| 167004 ||  || — || August 4, 2003 || Socorro || LINEAR || NYS || align=right data-sort-value="0.85" | 850 m || 
|-id=005 bgcolor=#fefefe
| 167005 ||  || — || August 4, 2003 || Socorro || LINEAR || NYS || align=right | 1.1 km || 
|-id=006 bgcolor=#fefefe
| 167006 ||  || — || August 1, 2003 || Socorro || LINEAR || KLI || align=right | 3.7 km || 
|-id=007 bgcolor=#fefefe
| 167007 ||  || — || August 4, 2003 || Socorro || LINEAR || — || align=right | 1.1 km || 
|-id=008 bgcolor=#fefefe
| 167008 ||  || — || August 1, 2003 || Socorro || LINEAR || — || align=right | 1.8 km || 
|-id=009 bgcolor=#fefefe
| 167009 ||  || — || August 18, 2003 || Haleakala || NEAT || MAS || align=right | 1.0 km || 
|-id=010 bgcolor=#fefefe
| 167010 Terracina ||  ||  || August 20, 2003 || Campo Imperatore || CINEOS || V || align=right | 1.0 km || 
|-id=011 bgcolor=#fefefe
| 167011 ||  || — || August 20, 2003 || Campo Imperatore || CINEOS || — || align=right | 1.8 km || 
|-id=012 bgcolor=#E9E9E9
| 167012 ||  || — || August 20, 2003 || Campo Imperatore || CINEOS || — || align=right | 1.3 km || 
|-id=013 bgcolor=#fefefe
| 167013 ||  || — || August 21, 2003 || Palomar || NEAT || V || align=right | 1.2 km || 
|-id=014 bgcolor=#fefefe
| 167014 ||  || — || August 22, 2003 || Palomar || NEAT || — || align=right | 3.3 km || 
|-id=015 bgcolor=#fefefe
| 167015 ||  || — || August 22, 2003 || Palomar || NEAT || — || align=right | 1.1 km || 
|-id=016 bgcolor=#fefefe
| 167016 ||  || — || August 20, 2003 || Palomar || NEAT || — || align=right | 1.5 km || 
|-id=017 bgcolor=#fefefe
| 167017 ||  || — || August 20, 2003 || Palomar || NEAT || — || align=right | 1.2 km || 
|-id=018 bgcolor=#fefefe
| 167018 Csontoscsaba ||  ||  || August 23, 2003 || Piszkéstető || K. Sárneczky || MAS || align=right | 1.1 km || 
|-id=019 bgcolor=#fefefe
| 167019 ||  || — || August 21, 2003 || Palomar || NEAT || NYS || align=right data-sort-value="0.91" | 910 m || 
|-id=020 bgcolor=#fefefe
| 167020 ||  || — || August 21, 2003 || Palomar || NEAT || — || align=right | 1.4 km || 
|-id=021 bgcolor=#fefefe
| 167021 ||  || — || August 21, 2003 || Palomar || NEAT || V || align=right data-sort-value="0.98" | 980 m || 
|-id=022 bgcolor=#fefefe
| 167022 ||  || — || August 22, 2003 || Palomar || NEAT || NYS || align=right | 2.7 km || 
|-id=023 bgcolor=#fefefe
| 167023 ||  || — || August 22, 2003 || Socorro || LINEAR || — || align=right | 1.5 km || 
|-id=024 bgcolor=#fefefe
| 167024 ||  || — || August 22, 2003 || Palomar || NEAT || NYS || align=right | 1.1 km || 
|-id=025 bgcolor=#E9E9E9
| 167025 ||  || — || August 22, 2003 || Palomar || NEAT || — || align=right | 1.3 km || 
|-id=026 bgcolor=#fefefe
| 167026 ||  || — || August 22, 2003 || Socorro || LINEAR || NYS || align=right data-sort-value="0.98" | 980 m || 
|-id=027 bgcolor=#fefefe
| 167027 ||  || — || August 22, 2003 || Socorro || LINEAR || NYS || align=right data-sort-value="0.95" | 950 m || 
|-id=028 bgcolor=#fefefe
| 167028 ||  || — || August 22, 2003 || Socorro || LINEAR || — || align=right | 1.4 km || 
|-id=029 bgcolor=#fefefe
| 167029 ||  || — || August 22, 2003 || Socorro || LINEAR || — || align=right | 1.6 km || 
|-id=030 bgcolor=#fefefe
| 167030 ||  || — || August 22, 2003 || Socorro || LINEAR || — || align=right | 2.3 km || 
|-id=031 bgcolor=#fefefe
| 167031 ||  || — || August 22, 2003 || Socorro || LINEAR || EUT || align=right | 1.1 km || 
|-id=032 bgcolor=#fefefe
| 167032 ||  || — || August 22, 2003 || Socorro || LINEAR || — || align=right | 2.8 km || 
|-id=033 bgcolor=#fefefe
| 167033 ||  || — || August 22, 2003 || Palomar || NEAT || — || align=right | 1.4 km || 
|-id=034 bgcolor=#fefefe
| 167034 ||  || — || August 22, 2003 || Palomar || NEAT || V || align=right | 1.0 km || 
|-id=035 bgcolor=#fefefe
| 167035 ||  || — || August 23, 2003 || Socorro || LINEAR || NYS || align=right | 1.1 km || 
|-id=036 bgcolor=#fefefe
| 167036 ||  || — || August 23, 2003 || Socorro || LINEAR || NYS || align=right | 1.2 km || 
|-id=037 bgcolor=#fefefe
| 167037 ||  || — || August 23, 2003 || Palomar || NEAT || NYS || align=right data-sort-value="0.84" | 840 m || 
|-id=038 bgcolor=#fefefe
| 167038 ||  || — || August 22, 2003 || Palomar || NEAT || MAS || align=right | 1.2 km || 
|-id=039 bgcolor=#fefefe
| 167039 ||  || — || August 22, 2003 || Palomar || NEAT || — || align=right | 1.7 km || 
|-id=040 bgcolor=#fefefe
| 167040 ||  || — || August 22, 2003 || Haleakala || NEAT || — || align=right | 1.1 km || 
|-id=041 bgcolor=#fefefe
| 167041 ||  || — || August 22, 2003 || Palomar || NEAT || — || align=right | 1.6 km || 
|-id=042 bgcolor=#fefefe
| 167042 ||  || — || August 23, 2003 || Palomar || NEAT || MAS || align=right | 1.3 km || 
|-id=043 bgcolor=#fefefe
| 167043 ||  || — || August 23, 2003 || Palomar || NEAT || CIM || align=right | 3.1 km || 
|-id=044 bgcolor=#fefefe
| 167044 ||  || — || August 23, 2003 || Socorro || LINEAR || — || align=right | 2.1 km || 
|-id=045 bgcolor=#fefefe
| 167045 ||  || — || August 23, 2003 || Socorro || LINEAR || V || align=right | 1.2 km || 
|-id=046 bgcolor=#fefefe
| 167046 ||  || — || August 23, 2003 || Socorro || LINEAR || — || align=right | 1.7 km || 
|-id=047 bgcolor=#fefefe
| 167047 ||  || — || August 23, 2003 || Socorro || LINEAR || NYS || align=right | 1.4 km || 
|-id=048 bgcolor=#fefefe
| 167048 ||  || — || August 23, 2003 || Socorro || LINEAR || — || align=right | 1.8 km || 
|-id=049 bgcolor=#fefefe
| 167049 ||  || — || August 23, 2003 || Socorro || LINEAR || ERI || align=right | 2.9 km || 
|-id=050 bgcolor=#fefefe
| 167050 ||  || — || August 23, 2003 || Socorro || LINEAR || — || align=right | 1.5 km || 
|-id=051 bgcolor=#fefefe
| 167051 ||  || — || August 23, 2003 || Socorro || LINEAR || — || align=right | 1.6 km || 
|-id=052 bgcolor=#fefefe
| 167052 ||  || — || August 23, 2003 || Socorro || LINEAR || NYS || align=right data-sort-value="0.99" | 990 m || 
|-id=053 bgcolor=#fefefe
| 167053 ||  || — || August 23, 2003 || Socorro || LINEAR || — || align=right | 1.6 km || 
|-id=054 bgcolor=#fefefe
| 167054 ||  || — || August 24, 2003 || Socorro || LINEAR || V || align=right | 1.0 km || 
|-id=055 bgcolor=#fefefe
| 167055 ||  || — || August 22, 2003 || Palomar || NEAT || — || align=right | 1.3 km || 
|-id=056 bgcolor=#E9E9E9
| 167056 ||  || — || August 23, 2003 || Palomar || NEAT || — || align=right | 1.6 km || 
|-id=057 bgcolor=#fefefe
| 167057 ||  || — || August 24, 2003 || Socorro || LINEAR || — || align=right | 1.5 km || 
|-id=058 bgcolor=#fefefe
| 167058 ||  || — || August 25, 2003 || Socorro || LINEAR || — || align=right | 1.1 km || 
|-id=059 bgcolor=#fefefe
| 167059 ||  || — || August 25, 2003 || Socorro || LINEAR || NYS || align=right | 1.1 km || 
|-id=060 bgcolor=#fefefe
| 167060 ||  || — || August 25, 2003 || Socorro || LINEAR || NYS || align=right | 1.4 km || 
|-id=061 bgcolor=#E9E9E9
| 167061 ||  || — || August 25, 2003 || Socorro || LINEAR || — || align=right | 2.0 km || 
|-id=062 bgcolor=#fefefe
| 167062 ||  || — || August 25, 2003 || Socorro || LINEAR || — || align=right | 1.5 km || 
|-id=063 bgcolor=#fefefe
| 167063 ||  || — || August 28, 2003 || Haleakala || NEAT || NYS || align=right | 1.1 km || 
|-id=064 bgcolor=#fefefe
| 167064 ||  || — || August 28, 2003 || Haleakala || NEAT || — || align=right | 1.5 km || 
|-id=065 bgcolor=#fefefe
| 167065 ||  || — || August 31, 2003 || Kitt Peak || Spacewatch || — || align=right | 1.2 km || 
|-id=066 bgcolor=#E9E9E9
| 167066 ||  || — || August 30, 2003 || Kitt Peak || Spacewatch || — || align=right | 1.3 km || 
|-id=067 bgcolor=#E9E9E9
| 167067 ||  || — || August 31, 2003 || Kitt Peak || Spacewatch || — || align=right | 2.2 km || 
|-id=068 bgcolor=#FA8072
| 167068 ||  || — || August 28, 2003 || Socorro || LINEAR || — || align=right | 3.3 km || 
|-id=069 bgcolor=#fefefe
| 167069 ||  || — || September 2, 2003 || Haleakala || NEAT || — || align=right | 2.0 km || 
|-id=070 bgcolor=#E9E9E9
| 167070 ||  || — || September 1, 2003 || Socorro || LINEAR || — || align=right | 1.8 km || 
|-id=071 bgcolor=#E9E9E9
| 167071 ||  || — || September 3, 2003 || Socorro || LINEAR || MIT || align=right | 4.2 km || 
|-id=072 bgcolor=#fefefe
| 167072 ||  || — || September 8, 2003 || Haleakala || NEAT || — || align=right | 2.2 km || 
|-id=073 bgcolor=#fefefe
| 167073 ||  || — || September 15, 2003 || Kleť || M. Tichý || — || align=right | 1.5 km || 
|-id=074 bgcolor=#fefefe
| 167074 ||  || — || September 14, 2003 || Haleakala || NEAT || V || align=right | 1.1 km || 
|-id=075 bgcolor=#fefefe
| 167075 ||  || — || September 14, 2003 || Palomar || NEAT || NYS || align=right | 2.7 km || 
|-id=076 bgcolor=#E9E9E9
| 167076 ||  || — || September 15, 2003 || Palomar || NEAT || — || align=right | 1.7 km || 
|-id=077 bgcolor=#fefefe
| 167077 ||  || — || September 15, 2003 || Anderson Mesa || LONEOS || — || align=right | 1.5 km || 
|-id=078 bgcolor=#fefefe
| 167078 ||  || — || September 15, 2003 || Anderson Mesa || LONEOS || — || align=right | 2.6 km || 
|-id=079 bgcolor=#fefefe
| 167079 ||  || — || September 13, 2003 || Haleakala || NEAT || — || align=right | 1.8 km || 
|-id=080 bgcolor=#fefefe
| 167080 ||  || — || September 13, 2003 || Haleakala || NEAT || — || align=right | 1.4 km || 
|-id=081 bgcolor=#fefefe
| 167081 ||  || — || September 14, 2003 || Haleakala || NEAT || — || align=right | 1.7 km || 
|-id=082 bgcolor=#E9E9E9
| 167082 ||  || — || September 3, 2003 || Socorro || LINEAR || — || align=right | 3.2 km || 
|-id=083 bgcolor=#fefefe
| 167083 ||  || — || September 15, 2003 || Palomar || NEAT || PHO || align=right | 1.5 km || 
|-id=084 bgcolor=#fefefe
| 167084 ||  || — || September 16, 2003 || Kitt Peak || Spacewatch || V || align=right | 1.3 km || 
|-id=085 bgcolor=#E9E9E9
| 167085 ||  || — || September 16, 2003 || Kitt Peak || Spacewatch || — || align=right | 2.2 km || 
|-id=086 bgcolor=#fefefe
| 167086 ||  || — || September 16, 2003 || Kitt Peak || Spacewatch || MAS || align=right | 1.2 km || 
|-id=087 bgcolor=#fefefe
| 167087 ||  || — || September 17, 2003 || Kitt Peak || Spacewatch || NYS || align=right | 1.1 km || 
|-id=088 bgcolor=#fefefe
| 167088 ||  || — || September 16, 2003 || Kitt Peak || Spacewatch || NYS || align=right | 1.1 km || 
|-id=089 bgcolor=#E9E9E9
| 167089 ||  || — || September 17, 2003 || Kitt Peak || Spacewatch || — || align=right | 1.0 km || 
|-id=090 bgcolor=#fefefe
| 167090 ||  || — || September 16, 2003 || Kitt Peak || Spacewatch || NYS || align=right data-sort-value="0.92" | 920 m || 
|-id=091 bgcolor=#E9E9E9
| 167091 ||  || — || September 16, 2003 || Kitt Peak || Spacewatch || HOF || align=right | 3.9 km || 
|-id=092 bgcolor=#fefefe
| 167092 ||  || — || September 17, 2003 || Haleakala || NEAT || — || align=right | 1.8 km || 
|-id=093 bgcolor=#E9E9E9
| 167093 ||  || — || September 18, 2003 || Palomar || NEAT || RAF || align=right | 2.1 km || 
|-id=094 bgcolor=#fefefe
| 167094 ||  || — || September 18, 2003 || Kitt Peak || Spacewatch || NYS || align=right data-sort-value="0.99" | 990 m || 
|-id=095 bgcolor=#E9E9E9
| 167095 ||  || — || September 17, 2003 || Palomar || NEAT || — || align=right | 1.9 km || 
|-id=096 bgcolor=#fefefe
| 167096 ||  || — || September 18, 2003 || Socorro || LINEAR || — || align=right | 1.4 km || 
|-id=097 bgcolor=#fefefe
| 167097 ||  || — || September 16, 2003 || Anderson Mesa || LONEOS || MAS || align=right | 1.4 km || 
|-id=098 bgcolor=#fefefe
| 167098 ||  || — || September 16, 2003 || Palomar || NEAT || — || align=right | 1.6 km || 
|-id=099 bgcolor=#fefefe
| 167099 ||  || — || September 16, 2003 || Palomar || NEAT || V || align=right | 1.3 km || 
|-id=100 bgcolor=#E9E9E9
| 167100 ||  || — || September 16, 2003 || Anderson Mesa || LONEOS || KON || align=right | 3.6 km || 
|}

167101–167200 

|-bgcolor=#fefefe
| 167101 ||  || — || September 16, 2003 || Anderson Mesa || LONEOS || — || align=right | 1.4 km || 
|-id=102 bgcolor=#fefefe
| 167102 ||  || — || September 16, 2003 || Anderson Mesa || LONEOS || — || align=right | 1.9 km || 
|-id=103 bgcolor=#fefefe
| 167103 ||  || — || September 18, 2003 || Palomar || NEAT || V || align=right | 1.3 km || 
|-id=104 bgcolor=#fefefe
| 167104 ||  || — || September 18, 2003 || Palomar || NEAT || — || align=right | 3.3 km || 
|-id=105 bgcolor=#E9E9E9
| 167105 ||  || — || September 18, 2003 || Palomar || NEAT || — || align=right | 1.7 km || 
|-id=106 bgcolor=#E9E9E9
| 167106 ||  || — || September 17, 2003 || Kitt Peak || Spacewatch || — || align=right | 1.9 km || 
|-id=107 bgcolor=#fefefe
| 167107 ||  || — || September 17, 2003 || Socorro || LINEAR || NYS || align=right | 1.1 km || 
|-id=108 bgcolor=#E9E9E9
| 167108 ||  || — || September 17, 2003 || Socorro || LINEAR || — || align=right | 2.1 km || 
|-id=109 bgcolor=#fefefe
| 167109 ||  || — || September 18, 2003 || Kitt Peak || Spacewatch || V || align=right | 1.2 km || 
|-id=110 bgcolor=#fefefe
| 167110 ||  || — || September 18, 2003 || Kitt Peak || Spacewatch || — || align=right data-sort-value="0.94" | 940 m || 
|-id=111 bgcolor=#E9E9E9
| 167111 ||  || — || September 19, 2003 || Kitt Peak || Spacewatch || — || align=right | 1.7 km || 
|-id=112 bgcolor=#fefefe
| 167112 ||  || — || September 19, 2003 || Kitt Peak || Spacewatch || — || align=right | 1.1 km || 
|-id=113 bgcolor=#E9E9E9
| 167113 Robertwick ||  ||  || September 19, 2003 || Junk Bond || D. Healy || — || align=right | 1.4 km || 
|-id=114 bgcolor=#E9E9E9
| 167114 ||  || — || September 18, 2003 || Socorro || LINEAR || — || align=right | 1.2 km || 
|-id=115 bgcolor=#E9E9E9
| 167115 ||  || — || September 16, 2003 || Kitt Peak || Spacewatch || MAR || align=right | 1.9 km || 
|-id=116 bgcolor=#fefefe
| 167116 ||  || — || September 17, 2003 || Socorro || LINEAR || — || align=right | 1.4 km || 
|-id=117 bgcolor=#fefefe
| 167117 ||  || — || September 18, 2003 || Socorro || LINEAR || NYS || align=right data-sort-value="0.91" | 910 m || 
|-id=118 bgcolor=#E9E9E9
| 167118 ||  || — || September 18, 2003 || Socorro || LINEAR || — || align=right | 1.9 km || 
|-id=119 bgcolor=#fefefe
| 167119 ||  || — || September 18, 2003 || Socorro || LINEAR || MAS || align=right | 1.4 km || 
|-id=120 bgcolor=#E9E9E9
| 167120 ||  || — || September 19, 2003 || Haleakala || NEAT || — || align=right | 2.7 km || 
|-id=121 bgcolor=#E9E9E9
| 167121 ||  || — || September 18, 2003 || Socorro || LINEAR || EUN || align=right | 1.5 km || 
|-id=122 bgcolor=#fefefe
| 167122 ||  || — || September 18, 2003 || Socorro || LINEAR || NYS || align=right | 1.3 km || 
|-id=123 bgcolor=#fefefe
| 167123 ||  || — || September 18, 2003 || Palomar || NEAT || — || align=right | 1.4 km || 
|-id=124 bgcolor=#E9E9E9
| 167124 ||  || — || September 18, 2003 || Socorro || LINEAR || — || align=right | 1.3 km || 
|-id=125 bgcolor=#E9E9E9
| 167125 ||  || — || September 19, 2003 || Palomar || NEAT || — || align=right data-sort-value="0.97" | 970 m || 
|-id=126 bgcolor=#E9E9E9
| 167126 ||  || — || September 20, 2003 || Campo Imperatore || CINEOS || — || align=right | 4.3 km || 
|-id=127 bgcolor=#E9E9E9
| 167127 ||  || — || September 21, 2003 || Socorro || LINEAR || — || align=right | 2.1 km || 
|-id=128 bgcolor=#fefefe
| 167128 ||  || — || September 16, 2003 || Socorro || LINEAR || — || align=right | 4.0 km || 
|-id=129 bgcolor=#fefefe
| 167129 ||  || — || September 19, 2003 || Anderson Mesa || LONEOS || — || align=right | 1.3 km || 
|-id=130 bgcolor=#fefefe
| 167130 ||  || — || September 19, 2003 || Anderson Mesa || LONEOS || MAS || align=right | 1.2 km || 
|-id=131 bgcolor=#fefefe
| 167131 ||  || — || September 22, 2003 || Kitt Peak || Spacewatch || — || align=right | 1.5 km || 
|-id=132 bgcolor=#fefefe
| 167132 ||  || — || September 19, 2003 || Kitt Peak || Spacewatch || MAS || align=right | 1.2 km || 
|-id=133 bgcolor=#E9E9E9
| 167133 ||  || — || September 20, 2003 || Anderson Mesa || LONEOS || — || align=right | 3.8 km || 
|-id=134 bgcolor=#E9E9E9
| 167134 ||  || — || September 22, 2003 || Socorro || LINEAR || ADE || align=right | 4.8 km || 
|-id=135 bgcolor=#E9E9E9
| 167135 ||  || — || September 19, 2003 || Palomar || NEAT || PAD || align=right | 4.0 km || 
|-id=136 bgcolor=#E9E9E9
| 167136 ||  || — || September 19, 2003 || Palomar || NEAT || — || align=right | 1.5 km || 
|-id=137 bgcolor=#fefefe
| 167137 ||  || — || September 21, 2003 || Kitt Peak || Spacewatch || — || align=right | 1.4 km || 
|-id=138 bgcolor=#fefefe
| 167138 ||  || — || September 20, 2003 || Palomar || NEAT || V || align=right | 1.3 km || 
|-id=139 bgcolor=#E9E9E9
| 167139 ||  || — || September 20, 2003 || Haleakala || NEAT || — || align=right | 3.5 km || 
|-id=140 bgcolor=#E9E9E9
| 167140 ||  || — || September 20, 2003 || Palomar || NEAT || — || align=right | 1.7 km || 
|-id=141 bgcolor=#fefefe
| 167141 ||  || — || September 21, 2003 || Anderson Mesa || LONEOS || — || align=right | 1.9 km || 
|-id=142 bgcolor=#E9E9E9
| 167142 ||  || — || September 21, 2003 || Anderson Mesa || LONEOS || — || align=right | 2.6 km || 
|-id=143 bgcolor=#E9E9E9
| 167143 ||  || — || September 21, 2003 || Anderson Mesa || LONEOS || — || align=right | 3.1 km || 
|-id=144 bgcolor=#fefefe
| 167144 ||  || — || September 25, 2003 || Palomar || NEAT || ERI || align=right | 3.6 km || 
|-id=145 bgcolor=#fefefe
| 167145 ||  || — || September 25, 2003 || Haleakala || NEAT || — || align=right | 1.4 km || 
|-id=146 bgcolor=#E9E9E9
| 167146 ||  || — || September 26, 2003 || Socorro || LINEAR || — || align=right | 1.6 km || 
|-id=147 bgcolor=#E9E9E9
| 167147 ||  || — || September 26, 2003 || Socorro || LINEAR || — || align=right | 2.1 km || 
|-id=148 bgcolor=#fefefe
| 167148 ||  || — || September 23, 2003 || Palomar || NEAT || — || align=right | 1.2 km || 
|-id=149 bgcolor=#fefefe
| 167149 ||  || — || September 23, 2003 || Palomar || NEAT || V || align=right | 1.1 km || 
|-id=150 bgcolor=#fefefe
| 167150 ||  || — || September 25, 2003 || Palomar || NEAT || — || align=right | 1.6 km || 
|-id=151 bgcolor=#fefefe
| 167151 ||  || — || September 25, 2003 || Palomar || NEAT || — || align=right | 3.6 km || 
|-id=152 bgcolor=#E9E9E9
| 167152 ||  || — || September 26, 2003 || Socorro || LINEAR || ADE || align=right | 4.2 km || 
|-id=153 bgcolor=#E9E9E9
| 167153 ||  || — || September 27, 2003 || Desert Eagle || W. K. Y. Yeung || — || align=right | 1.8 km || 
|-id=154 bgcolor=#E9E9E9
| 167154 ||  || — || September 27, 2003 || Desert Eagle || W. K. Y. Yeung || — || align=right | 2.0 km || 
|-id=155 bgcolor=#E9E9E9
| 167155 ||  || — || September 28, 2003 || Desert Eagle || W. K. Y. Yeung || — || align=right | 3.4 km || 
|-id=156 bgcolor=#E9E9E9
| 167156 ||  || — || September 27, 2003 || Socorro || LINEAR || WIT || align=right | 1.9 km || 
|-id=157 bgcolor=#fefefe
| 167157 ||  || — || September 25, 2003 || Palomar || NEAT || V || align=right | 1.2 km || 
|-id=158 bgcolor=#E9E9E9
| 167158 ||  || — || September 26, 2003 || Socorro || LINEAR || — || align=right | 1.4 km || 
|-id=159 bgcolor=#fefefe
| 167159 ||  || — || September 27, 2003 || Socorro || LINEAR || V || align=right data-sort-value="0.82" | 820 m || 
|-id=160 bgcolor=#fefefe
| 167160 ||  || — || September 27, 2003 || Socorro || LINEAR || NYS || align=right | 2.6 km || 
|-id=161 bgcolor=#fefefe
| 167161 ||  || — || September 26, 2003 || Socorro || LINEAR || — || align=right | 1.6 km || 
|-id=162 bgcolor=#E9E9E9
| 167162 ||  || — || September 26, 2003 || Socorro || LINEAR || — || align=right | 2.2 km || 
|-id=163 bgcolor=#E9E9E9
| 167163 ||  || — || September 26, 2003 || Socorro || LINEAR || EUN || align=right | 1.4 km || 
|-id=164 bgcolor=#fefefe
| 167164 ||  || — || September 26, 2003 || Socorro || LINEAR || NYS || align=right | 2.8 km || 
|-id=165 bgcolor=#fefefe
| 167165 ||  || — || September 26, 2003 || Socorro || LINEAR || V || align=right | 1.1 km || 
|-id=166 bgcolor=#E9E9E9
| 167166 ||  || — || September 26, 2003 || Socorro || LINEAR || — || align=right | 4.3 km || 
|-id=167 bgcolor=#E9E9E9
| 167167 ||  || — || September 26, 2003 || Socorro || LINEAR || — || align=right | 4.2 km || 
|-id=168 bgcolor=#E9E9E9
| 167168 ||  || — || September 26, 2003 || Socorro || LINEAR || — || align=right | 1.5 km || 
|-id=169 bgcolor=#E9E9E9
| 167169 ||  || — || September 26, 2003 || Socorro || LINEAR || — || align=right | 4.5 km || 
|-id=170 bgcolor=#E9E9E9
| 167170 ||  || — || September 26, 2003 || Socorro || LINEAR || — || align=right | 3.3 km || 
|-id=171 bgcolor=#E9E9E9
| 167171 ||  || — || September 28, 2003 || Socorro || LINEAR || — || align=right | 1.3 km || 
|-id=172 bgcolor=#fefefe
| 167172 ||  || — || September 28, 2003 || Socorro || LINEAR || NYS || align=right | 1.3 km || 
|-id=173 bgcolor=#E9E9E9
| 167173 ||  || — || September 28, 2003 || Kitt Peak || Spacewatch || RAF || align=right | 2.2 km || 
|-id=174 bgcolor=#E9E9E9
| 167174 ||  || — || September 27, 2003 || Kitt Peak || Spacewatch || RAF || align=right | 1.2 km || 
|-id=175 bgcolor=#E9E9E9
| 167175 ||  || — || September 29, 2003 || Socorro || LINEAR || — || align=right | 3.2 km || 
|-id=176 bgcolor=#fefefe
| 167176 ||  || — || September 28, 2003 || Goodricke-Pigott || R. A. Tucker || NYS || align=right | 1.3 km || 
|-id=177 bgcolor=#fefefe
| 167177 ||  || — || September 25, 2003 || Haleakala || NEAT || V || align=right | 1.1 km || 
|-id=178 bgcolor=#E9E9E9
| 167178 ||  || — || September 27, 2003 || Socorro || LINEAR || MAR || align=right | 1.5 km || 
|-id=179 bgcolor=#E9E9E9
| 167179 ||  || — || September 27, 2003 || Socorro || LINEAR || — || align=right | 3.3 km || 
|-id=180 bgcolor=#fefefe
| 167180 ||  || — || September 28, 2003 || Kitt Peak || Spacewatch || — || align=right | 1.9 km || 
|-id=181 bgcolor=#E9E9E9
| 167181 ||  || — || September 30, 2003 || Socorro || LINEAR || MAR || align=right | 1.7 km || 
|-id=182 bgcolor=#fefefe
| 167182 ||  || — || September 19, 2003 || Kitt Peak || Spacewatch || — || align=right | 2.8 km || 
|-id=183 bgcolor=#E9E9E9
| 167183 ||  || — || September 20, 2003 || Socorro || LINEAR || — || align=right | 5.3 km || 
|-id=184 bgcolor=#E9E9E9
| 167184 ||  || — || September 21, 2003 || Palomar || NEAT || — || align=right | 4.2 km || 
|-id=185 bgcolor=#E9E9E9
| 167185 ||  || — || September 30, 2003 || Socorro || LINEAR || — || align=right | 1.9 km || 
|-id=186 bgcolor=#fefefe
| 167186 ||  || — || September 28, 2003 || Socorro || LINEAR || NYS || align=right | 1.4 km || 
|-id=187 bgcolor=#E9E9E9
| 167187 ||  || — || September 28, 2003 || Socorro || LINEAR || — || align=right | 5.3 km || 
|-id=188 bgcolor=#E9E9E9
| 167188 ||  || — || September 28, 2003 || Socorro || LINEAR || EUN || align=right | 2.8 km || 
|-id=189 bgcolor=#E9E9E9
| 167189 ||  || — || September 30, 2003 || Socorro || LINEAR || — || align=right | 4.8 km || 
|-id=190 bgcolor=#E9E9E9
| 167190 ||  || — || September 17, 2003 || Palomar || NEAT || — || align=right | 2.0 km || 
|-id=191 bgcolor=#E9E9E9
| 167191 ||  || — || September 30, 2003 || Socorro || LINEAR || — || align=right | 5.0 km || 
|-id=192 bgcolor=#fefefe
| 167192 ||  || — || September 27, 2003 || Socorro || LINEAR || V || align=right data-sort-value="0.70" | 700 m || 
|-id=193 bgcolor=#E9E9E9
| 167193 ||  || — || September 27, 2003 || Socorro || LINEAR || KAZ || align=right | 1.8 km || 
|-id=194 bgcolor=#E9E9E9
| 167194 ||  || — || September 28, 2003 || Socorro || LINEAR || — || align=right | 3.1 km || 
|-id=195 bgcolor=#d6d6d6
| 167195 ||  || — || October 2, 2003 || Kitt Peak || Spacewatch || — || align=right | 4.5 km || 
|-id=196 bgcolor=#E9E9E9
| 167196 ||  || — || October 2, 2003 || Socorro || LINEAR || MAR || align=right | 1.9 km || 
|-id=197 bgcolor=#E9E9E9
| 167197 ||  || — || October 2, 2003 || Socorro || LINEAR || EUN || align=right | 2.2 km || 
|-id=198 bgcolor=#E9E9E9
| 167198 ||  || — || October 1, 2003 || Anderson Mesa || LONEOS || — || align=right | 2.0 km || 
|-id=199 bgcolor=#E9E9E9
| 167199 ||  || — || October 14, 2003 || Anderson Mesa || LONEOS || — || align=right | 2.1 km || 
|-id=200 bgcolor=#E9E9E9
| 167200 ||  || — || October 15, 2003 || Anderson Mesa || LONEOS || — || align=right | 1.6 km || 
|}

167201–167300 

|-bgcolor=#E9E9E9
| 167201 ||  || — || October 14, 2003 || Palomar || NEAT || — || align=right | 2.6 km || 
|-id=202 bgcolor=#E9E9E9
| 167202 ||  || — || October 14, 2003 || Palomar || NEAT || BRU || align=right | 5.9 km || 
|-id=203 bgcolor=#E9E9E9
| 167203 ||  || — || October 15, 2003 || Anderson Mesa || LONEOS || — || align=right | 4.8 km || 
|-id=204 bgcolor=#E9E9E9
| 167204 ||  || — || October 1, 2003 || Kitt Peak || Spacewatch || HEN || align=right | 1.00 km || 
|-id=205 bgcolor=#E9E9E9
| 167205 ||  || — || October 2, 2003 || Kitt Peak || Spacewatch || NEM || align=right | 3.3 km || 
|-id=206 bgcolor=#fefefe
| 167206 ||  || — || October 5, 2003 || Kitt Peak || Spacewatch || NYS || align=right | 1.0 km || 
|-id=207 bgcolor=#E9E9E9
| 167207 ||  || — || October 16, 2003 || Palomar || NEAT || — || align=right | 1.6 km || 
|-id=208 bgcolor=#E9E9E9
| 167208 Lelekovice ||  ||  || October 17, 2003 || Ondřejov || P. Kušnirák, K. Hornoch || — || align=right | 2.0 km || 
|-id=209 bgcolor=#E9E9E9
| 167209 ||  || — || October 16, 2003 || Palomar || NEAT || — || align=right | 3.3 km || 
|-id=210 bgcolor=#E9E9E9
| 167210 ||  || — || October 16, 2003 || Kitt Peak || Spacewatch || — || align=right | 2.6 km || 
|-id=211 bgcolor=#E9E9E9
| 167211 ||  || — || October 16, 2003 || Anderson Mesa || LONEOS || — || align=right | 1.2 km || 
|-id=212 bgcolor=#E9E9E9
| 167212 ||  || — || October 19, 2003 || Anderson Mesa || LONEOS || — || align=right | 4.4 km || 
|-id=213 bgcolor=#E9E9E9
| 167213 ||  || — || October 20, 2003 || Palomar || NEAT || — || align=right | 2.1 km || 
|-id=214 bgcolor=#E9E9E9
| 167214 ||  || — || October 22, 2003 || Anderson Mesa || LONEOS || — || align=right | 2.2 km || 
|-id=215 bgcolor=#E9E9E9
| 167215 ||  || — || October 21, 2003 || Socorro || LINEAR || — || align=right | 1.4 km || 
|-id=216 bgcolor=#E9E9E9
| 167216 ||  || — || October 24, 2003 || Haleakala || NEAT || ADE || align=right | 3.1 km || 
|-id=217 bgcolor=#fefefe
| 167217 ||  || — || October 21, 2003 || Anderson Mesa || LONEOS || NYS || align=right | 1.1 km || 
|-id=218 bgcolor=#fefefe
| 167218 ||  || — || October 16, 2003 || Kitt Peak || Spacewatch || — || align=right | 1.2 km || 
|-id=219 bgcolor=#fefefe
| 167219 ||  || — || October 16, 2003 || Kitt Peak || Spacewatch || NYS || align=right | 1.1 km || 
|-id=220 bgcolor=#E9E9E9
| 167220 ||  || — || October 16, 2003 || Kitt Peak || Spacewatch || — || align=right | 1.8 km || 
|-id=221 bgcolor=#E9E9E9
| 167221 ||  || — || October 16, 2003 || Kitt Peak || Spacewatch || — || align=right | 2.0 km || 
|-id=222 bgcolor=#E9E9E9
| 167222 ||  || — || October 16, 2003 || Kitt Peak || Spacewatch || — || align=right | 3.5 km || 
|-id=223 bgcolor=#E9E9E9
| 167223 ||  || — || October 16, 2003 || Kitt Peak || Spacewatch || AGN || align=right | 1.8 km || 
|-id=224 bgcolor=#E9E9E9
| 167224 ||  || — || October 16, 2003 || Anderson Mesa || LONEOS || — || align=right | 1.8 km || 
|-id=225 bgcolor=#E9E9E9
| 167225 ||  || — || October 18, 2003 || Kitt Peak || Spacewatch || — || align=right | 1.7 km || 
|-id=226 bgcolor=#E9E9E9
| 167226 ||  || — || October 18, 2003 || Kitt Peak || Spacewatch || — || align=right | 3.1 km || 
|-id=227 bgcolor=#E9E9E9
| 167227 ||  || — || October 18, 2003 || Anderson Mesa || LONEOS || HNS || align=right | 2.2 km || 
|-id=228 bgcolor=#E9E9E9
| 167228 ||  || — || October 18, 2003 || Palomar || NEAT || — || align=right | 2.9 km || 
|-id=229 bgcolor=#E9E9E9
| 167229 ||  || — || October 22, 2003 || Socorro || LINEAR || MIS || align=right | 3.5 km || 
|-id=230 bgcolor=#E9E9E9
| 167230 ||  || — || October 26, 2003 || Kvistaberg || UDAS || — || align=right | 3.0 km || 
|-id=231 bgcolor=#E9E9E9
| 167231 ||  || — || October 16, 2003 || Kitt Peak || Spacewatch || EUN || align=right | 1.6 km || 
|-id=232 bgcolor=#E9E9E9
| 167232 ||  || — || October 16, 2003 || Palomar || NEAT || EUN || align=right | 2.3 km || 
|-id=233 bgcolor=#E9E9E9
| 167233 ||  || — || October 16, 2003 || Anderson Mesa || LONEOS || — || align=right | 4.3 km || 
|-id=234 bgcolor=#E9E9E9
| 167234 ||  || — || October 16, 2003 || Palomar || NEAT || — || align=right | 1.4 km || 
|-id=235 bgcolor=#E9E9E9
| 167235 ||  || — || October 16, 2003 || Anderson Mesa || LONEOS || — || align=right | 2.6 km || 
|-id=236 bgcolor=#E9E9E9
| 167236 ||  || — || October 16, 2003 || Palomar || NEAT || PAE || align=right | 3.7 km || 
|-id=237 bgcolor=#E9E9E9
| 167237 ||  || — || October 18, 2003 || Kitt Peak || Spacewatch || — || align=right | 1.8 km || 
|-id=238 bgcolor=#E9E9E9
| 167238 ||  || — || October 16, 2003 || Palomar || NEAT || — || align=right | 1.7 km || 
|-id=239 bgcolor=#E9E9E9
| 167239 ||  || — || October 17, 2003 || Kitt Peak || Spacewatch || — || align=right | 2.2 km || 
|-id=240 bgcolor=#fefefe
| 167240 ||  || — || October 18, 2003 || Kitt Peak || Spacewatch || NYS || align=right data-sort-value="0.85" | 850 m || 
|-id=241 bgcolor=#E9E9E9
| 167241 ||  || — || October 20, 2003 || Socorro || LINEAR || — || align=right | 3.7 km || 
|-id=242 bgcolor=#E9E9E9
| 167242 ||  || — || October 20, 2003 || Kitt Peak || Spacewatch || — || align=right | 2.3 km || 
|-id=243 bgcolor=#E9E9E9
| 167243 ||  || — || October 18, 2003 || Kitt Peak || Spacewatch || EUN || align=right | 2.3 km || 
|-id=244 bgcolor=#fefefe
| 167244 ||  || — || October 18, 2003 || Kitt Peak || Spacewatch || — || align=right | 1.6 km || 
|-id=245 bgcolor=#E9E9E9
| 167245 ||  || — || October 19, 2003 || Kitt Peak || Spacewatch || — || align=right | 2.2 km || 
|-id=246 bgcolor=#E9E9E9
| 167246 ||  || — || October 19, 2003 || Kitt Peak || Spacewatch || — || align=right | 2.4 km || 
|-id=247 bgcolor=#E9E9E9
| 167247 ||  || — || October 19, 2003 || Kitt Peak || Spacewatch || HEN || align=right | 1.6 km || 
|-id=248 bgcolor=#E9E9E9
| 167248 ||  || — || October 19, 2003 || Anderson Mesa || LONEOS || GER || align=right | 2.6 km || 
|-id=249 bgcolor=#E9E9E9
| 167249 ||  || — || October 19, 2003 || Anderson Mesa || LONEOS || — || align=right | 3.4 km || 
|-id=250 bgcolor=#E9E9E9
| 167250 ||  || — || October 19, 2003 || Anderson Mesa || LONEOS || — || align=right | 3.9 km || 
|-id=251 bgcolor=#E9E9E9
| 167251 ||  || — || October 18, 2003 || Kitt Peak || Spacewatch || — || align=right | 1.3 km || 
|-id=252 bgcolor=#E9E9E9
| 167252 ||  || — || October 19, 2003 || Kitt Peak || Spacewatch || NEM || align=right | 3.9 km || 
|-id=253 bgcolor=#E9E9E9
| 167253 ||  || — || October 19, 2003 || Kitt Peak || Spacewatch || — || align=right | 1.9 km || 
|-id=254 bgcolor=#E9E9E9
| 167254 ||  || — || October 20, 2003 || Socorro || LINEAR || MAR || align=right | 2.2 km || 
|-id=255 bgcolor=#E9E9E9
| 167255 ||  || — || October 20, 2003 || Palomar || NEAT || — || align=right | 5.3 km || 
|-id=256 bgcolor=#E9E9E9
| 167256 ||  || — || October 21, 2003 || Socorro || LINEAR || RAF || align=right | 1.3 km || 
|-id=257 bgcolor=#E9E9E9
| 167257 ||  || — || October 17, 2003 || Anderson Mesa || LONEOS || NEM || align=right | 3.1 km || 
|-id=258 bgcolor=#E9E9E9
| 167258 ||  || — || October 18, 2003 || Kitt Peak || Spacewatch || NEM || align=right | 2.8 km || 
|-id=259 bgcolor=#E9E9E9
| 167259 ||  || — || October 18, 2003 || Palomar || NEAT || MAR || align=right | 1.6 km || 
|-id=260 bgcolor=#E9E9E9
| 167260 ||  || — || October 19, 2003 || Kitt Peak || Spacewatch || — || align=right | 1.8 km || 
|-id=261 bgcolor=#E9E9E9
| 167261 ||  || — || October 19, 2003 || Socorro || LINEAR || — || align=right | 2.7 km || 
|-id=262 bgcolor=#E9E9E9
| 167262 ||  || — || October 19, 2003 || Kitt Peak || Spacewatch || — || align=right | 2.4 km || 
|-id=263 bgcolor=#E9E9E9
| 167263 ||  || — || October 21, 2003 || Kitt Peak || Spacewatch || — || align=right | 1.2 km || 
|-id=264 bgcolor=#E9E9E9
| 167264 ||  || — || October 21, 2003 || Kitt Peak || Spacewatch || — || align=right | 2.0 km || 
|-id=265 bgcolor=#E9E9E9
| 167265 ||  || — || October 18, 2003 || Palomar || NEAT || — || align=right | 2.9 km || 
|-id=266 bgcolor=#E9E9E9
| 167266 ||  || — || October 18, 2003 || Palomar || NEAT || — || align=right | 2.8 km || 
|-id=267 bgcolor=#E9E9E9
| 167267 ||  || — || October 19, 2003 || Palomar || NEAT || MAR || align=right | 2.4 km || 
|-id=268 bgcolor=#E9E9E9
| 167268 ||  || — || October 21, 2003 || Socorro || LINEAR || — || align=right | 1.3 km || 
|-id=269 bgcolor=#E9E9E9
| 167269 ||  || — || October 18, 2003 || Anderson Mesa || LONEOS || RAF || align=right | 1.6 km || 
|-id=270 bgcolor=#E9E9E9
| 167270 ||  || — || October 18, 2003 || Anderson Mesa || LONEOS || — || align=right | 2.3 km || 
|-id=271 bgcolor=#E9E9E9
| 167271 ||  || — || October 18, 2003 || Anderson Mesa || LONEOS || ADE || align=right | 3.2 km || 
|-id=272 bgcolor=#E9E9E9
| 167272 ||  || — || October 18, 2003 || Kitt Peak || Spacewatch || — || align=right | 1.6 km || 
|-id=273 bgcolor=#E9E9E9
| 167273 ||  || — || October 19, 2003 || Anderson Mesa || LONEOS || — || align=right | 2.8 km || 
|-id=274 bgcolor=#E9E9E9
| 167274 ||  || — || October 19, 2003 || Kitt Peak || Spacewatch || MAR || align=right | 2.4 km || 
|-id=275 bgcolor=#E9E9E9
| 167275 ||  || — || October 19, 2003 || Kitt Peak || Spacewatch || — || align=right | 2.5 km || 
|-id=276 bgcolor=#E9E9E9
| 167276 ||  || — || October 20, 2003 || Kitt Peak || Spacewatch || — || align=right | 3.9 km || 
|-id=277 bgcolor=#E9E9E9
| 167277 ||  || — || October 21, 2003 || Kitt Peak || Spacewatch || — || align=right | 1.3 km || 
|-id=278 bgcolor=#E9E9E9
| 167278 ||  || — || October 21, 2003 || Socorro || LINEAR || — || align=right | 3.7 km || 
|-id=279 bgcolor=#E9E9E9
| 167279 ||  || — || October 21, 2003 || Kitt Peak || Spacewatch || — || align=right | 1.9 km || 
|-id=280 bgcolor=#E9E9E9
| 167280 ||  || — || October 22, 2003 || Socorro || LINEAR || — || align=right | 1.5 km || 
|-id=281 bgcolor=#E9E9E9
| 167281 ||  || — || October 22, 2003 || Socorro || LINEAR || EUN || align=right | 1.8 km || 
|-id=282 bgcolor=#E9E9E9
| 167282 ||  || — || October 22, 2003 || Socorro || LINEAR || — || align=right | 2.6 km || 
|-id=283 bgcolor=#E9E9E9
| 167283 ||  || — || October 22, 2003 || Kitt Peak || Spacewatch || — || align=right | 2.4 km || 
|-id=284 bgcolor=#E9E9E9
| 167284 ||  || — || October 21, 2003 || Palomar || NEAT || — || align=right | 1.6 km || 
|-id=285 bgcolor=#E9E9E9
| 167285 ||  || — || October 21, 2003 || Socorro || LINEAR || — || align=right | 4.1 km || 
|-id=286 bgcolor=#E9E9E9
| 167286 ||  || — || October 21, 2003 || Kitt Peak || Spacewatch || — || align=right | 3.8 km || 
|-id=287 bgcolor=#E9E9E9
| 167287 ||  || — || October 21, 2003 || Socorro || LINEAR || — || align=right | 2.7 km || 
|-id=288 bgcolor=#E9E9E9
| 167288 ||  || — || October 22, 2003 || Haleakala || NEAT || — || align=right | 3.0 km || 
|-id=289 bgcolor=#E9E9E9
| 167289 ||  || — || October 20, 2003 || Kitt Peak || Spacewatch || — || align=right | 3.3 km || 
|-id=290 bgcolor=#E9E9E9
| 167290 ||  || — || October 21, 2003 || Kitt Peak || Spacewatch || HEN || align=right | 1.7 km || 
|-id=291 bgcolor=#fefefe
| 167291 ||  || — || October 21, 2003 || Socorro || LINEAR || MAS || align=right | 1.3 km || 
|-id=292 bgcolor=#E9E9E9
| 167292 ||  || — || October 21, 2003 || Socorro || LINEAR || — || align=right | 1.2 km || 
|-id=293 bgcolor=#E9E9E9
| 167293 ||  || — || October 22, 2003 || Socorro || LINEAR || RAF || align=right | 1.7 km || 
|-id=294 bgcolor=#E9E9E9
| 167294 ||  || — || October 22, 2003 || Socorro || LINEAR || — || align=right | 2.5 km || 
|-id=295 bgcolor=#E9E9E9
| 167295 ||  || — || October 23, 2003 || Kitt Peak || Spacewatch || HOF || align=right | 4.7 km || 
|-id=296 bgcolor=#E9E9E9
| 167296 ||  || — || October 23, 2003 || Anderson Mesa || LONEOS || — || align=right | 1.4 km || 
|-id=297 bgcolor=#E9E9E9
| 167297 ||  || — || October 23, 2003 || Kitt Peak || Spacewatch || — || align=right | 3.6 km || 
|-id=298 bgcolor=#E9E9E9
| 167298 ||  || — || October 23, 2003 || Kitt Peak || Spacewatch || — || align=right | 3.5 km || 
|-id=299 bgcolor=#E9E9E9
| 167299 ||  || — || October 21, 2003 || Kitt Peak || Spacewatch || — || align=right | 2.1 km || 
|-id=300 bgcolor=#fefefe
| 167300 ||  || — || October 21, 2003 || Socorro || LINEAR || — || align=right | 1.3 km || 
|}

167301–167400 

|-bgcolor=#fefefe
| 167301 ||  || — || October 21, 2003 || Palomar || NEAT || — || align=right | 1.3 km || 
|-id=302 bgcolor=#E9E9E9
| 167302 ||  || — || October 21, 2003 || Socorro || LINEAR || PAD || align=right | 3.8 km || 
|-id=303 bgcolor=#E9E9E9
| 167303 ||  || — || October 22, 2003 || Socorro || LINEAR || — || align=right | 3.4 km || 
|-id=304 bgcolor=#E9E9E9
| 167304 ||  || — || October 22, 2003 || Socorro || LINEAR || — || align=right | 2.9 km || 
|-id=305 bgcolor=#E9E9E9
| 167305 ||  || — || October 23, 2003 || Kitt Peak || Spacewatch || — || align=right | 2.2 km || 
|-id=306 bgcolor=#E9E9E9
| 167306 ||  || — || October 23, 2003 || Anderson Mesa || LONEOS || — || align=right | 3.7 km || 
|-id=307 bgcolor=#E9E9E9
| 167307 ||  || — || October 24, 2003 || Socorro || LINEAR || — || align=right | 1.1 km || 
|-id=308 bgcolor=#E9E9E9
| 167308 ||  || — || October 24, 2003 || Kitt Peak || Spacewatch || — || align=right | 3.9 km || 
|-id=309 bgcolor=#E9E9E9
| 167309 ||  || — || October 23, 2003 || Kitt Peak || Spacewatch || — || align=right | 2.4 km || 
|-id=310 bgcolor=#E9E9E9
| 167310 ||  || — || October 24, 2003 || Socorro || LINEAR || — || align=right | 2.1 km || 
|-id=311 bgcolor=#E9E9E9
| 167311 ||  || — || October 24, 2003 || Socorro || LINEAR || — || align=right | 1.7 km || 
|-id=312 bgcolor=#E9E9E9
| 167312 ||  || — || October 24, 2003 || Socorro || LINEAR || — || align=right | 2.1 km || 
|-id=313 bgcolor=#E9E9E9
| 167313 ||  || — || October 24, 2003 || Socorro || LINEAR || — || align=right | 2.2 km || 
|-id=314 bgcolor=#E9E9E9
| 167314 ||  || — || October 24, 2003 || Socorro || LINEAR || — || align=right | 2.8 km || 
|-id=315 bgcolor=#E9E9E9
| 167315 ||  || — || October 24, 2003 || Socorro || LINEAR || — || align=right | 2.5 km || 
|-id=316 bgcolor=#E9E9E9
| 167316 ||  || — || October 24, 2003 || Socorro || LINEAR || — || align=right | 1.5 km || 
|-id=317 bgcolor=#E9E9E9
| 167317 ||  || — || October 25, 2003 || Socorro || LINEAR || — || align=right | 2.3 km || 
|-id=318 bgcolor=#E9E9E9
| 167318 ||  || — || October 26, 2003 || Kitt Peak || Spacewatch || PAD || align=right | 4.3 km || 
|-id=319 bgcolor=#E9E9E9
| 167319 ||  || — || October 25, 2003 || Socorro || LINEAR || — || align=right | 4.4 km || 
|-id=320 bgcolor=#E9E9E9
| 167320 ||  || — || October 25, 2003 || Socorro || LINEAR || — || align=right | 2.0 km || 
|-id=321 bgcolor=#E9E9E9
| 167321 ||  || — || October 25, 2003 || Socorro || LINEAR || — || align=right | 2.0 km || 
|-id=322 bgcolor=#E9E9E9
| 167322 ||  || — || October 25, 2003 || Socorro || LINEAR || — || align=right | 1.9 km || 
|-id=323 bgcolor=#E9E9E9
| 167323 ||  || — || October 27, 2003 || Anderson Mesa || LONEOS || — || align=right | 3.0 km || 
|-id=324 bgcolor=#E9E9E9
| 167324 ||  || — || October 27, 2003 || Anderson Mesa || LONEOS || — || align=right | 4.2 km || 
|-id=325 bgcolor=#E9E9E9
| 167325 ||  || — || October 27, 2003 || Socorro || LINEAR || — || align=right | 1.6 km || 
|-id=326 bgcolor=#E9E9E9
| 167326 ||  || — || October 28, 2003 || Socorro || LINEAR || — || align=right | 5.2 km || 
|-id=327 bgcolor=#E9E9E9
| 167327 ||  || — || October 28, 2003 || Socorro || LINEAR || GEF || align=right | 2.2 km || 
|-id=328 bgcolor=#E9E9E9
| 167328 ||  || — || October 17, 2003 || Palomar || NEAT || — || align=right | 2.0 km || 
|-id=329 bgcolor=#E9E9E9
| 167329 ||  || — || October 29, 2003 || Socorro || LINEAR || — || align=right | 1.8 km || 
|-id=330 bgcolor=#E9E9E9
| 167330 ||  || — || October 30, 2003 || Socorro || LINEAR || — || align=right | 4.4 km || 
|-id=331 bgcolor=#E9E9E9
| 167331 ||  || — || October 30, 2003 || Socorro || LINEAR || EUN || align=right | 2.2 km || 
|-id=332 bgcolor=#E9E9E9
| 167332 ||  || — || October 27, 2003 || Socorro || LINEAR || — || align=right | 1.4 km || 
|-id=333 bgcolor=#fefefe
| 167333 ||  || — || October 27, 2003 || Socorro || LINEAR || — || align=right | 1.9 km || 
|-id=334 bgcolor=#E9E9E9
| 167334 ||  || — || October 28, 2003 || Socorro || LINEAR || — || align=right | 2.9 km || 
|-id=335 bgcolor=#E9E9E9
| 167335 ||  || — || October 29, 2003 || Anderson Mesa || LONEOS || — || align=right | 1.5 km || 
|-id=336 bgcolor=#E9E9E9
| 167336 ||  || — || October 23, 2003 || Kitt Peak || M. W. Buie || — || align=right | 1.2 km || 
|-id=337 bgcolor=#E9E9E9
| 167337 ||  || — || October 23, 2003 || Kitt Peak || M. W. Buie || — || align=right | 1.8 km || 
|-id=338 bgcolor=#E9E9E9
| 167338 ||  || — || October 16, 2003 || Kitt Peak || Spacewatch || MIS || align=right | 2.7 km || 
|-id=339 bgcolor=#E9E9E9
| 167339 ||  || — || October 19, 2003 || Kitt Peak || Spacewatch || — || align=right | 2.4 km || 
|-id=340 bgcolor=#E9E9E9
| 167340 ||  || — || October 16, 2003 || Anderson Mesa || LONEOS || — || align=right | 1.7 km || 
|-id=341 bgcolor=#E9E9E9
| 167341 Börzsöny || 2003 VG ||  || November 3, 2003 || Piszkéstető || K. Sárneczky || — || align=right | 3.3 km || 
|-id=342 bgcolor=#E9E9E9
| 167342 ||  || — || November 1, 2003 || Socorro || LINEAR || — || align=right | 2.5 km || 
|-id=343 bgcolor=#E9E9E9
| 167343 ||  || — || November 15, 2003 || Kitt Peak || Spacewatch || — || align=right | 1.5 km || 
|-id=344 bgcolor=#E9E9E9
| 167344 ||  || — || November 9, 2003 || Haleakala || NEAT || — || align=right | 4.7 km || 
|-id=345 bgcolor=#E9E9E9
| 167345 ||  || — || November 14, 2003 || Palomar || NEAT || RAF || align=right | 1.9 km || 
|-id=346 bgcolor=#fefefe
| 167346 ||  || — || November 15, 2003 || Kitt Peak || Spacewatch || NYS || align=right | 1.2 km || 
|-id=347 bgcolor=#E9E9E9
| 167347 ||  || — || November 18, 2003 || Palomar || NEAT || — || align=right | 2.1 km || 
|-id=348 bgcolor=#E9E9E9
| 167348 ||  || — || November 16, 2003 || Kitt Peak || Spacewatch || ADE || align=right | 4.5 km || 
|-id=349 bgcolor=#E9E9E9
| 167349 ||  || — || November 16, 2003 || Kitt Peak || Spacewatch || — || align=right | 4.2 km || 
|-id=350 bgcolor=#E9E9E9
| 167350 ||  || — || November 18, 2003 || Kitt Peak || Spacewatch || — || align=right | 6.3 km || 
|-id=351 bgcolor=#E9E9E9
| 167351 ||  || — || November 18, 2003 || Palomar || NEAT || — || align=right | 1.4 km || 
|-id=352 bgcolor=#E9E9E9
| 167352 ||  || — || November 19, 2003 || Palomar || NEAT || JUN || align=right | 1.6 km || 
|-id=353 bgcolor=#E9E9E9
| 167353 ||  || — || November 16, 2003 || Kitt Peak || Spacewatch || — || align=right | 3.2 km || 
|-id=354 bgcolor=#E9E9E9
| 167354 ||  || — || November 16, 2003 || Kitt Peak || Spacewatch || — || align=right | 2.6 km || 
|-id=355 bgcolor=#E9E9E9
| 167355 ||  || — || November 18, 2003 || Palomar || NEAT || — || align=right | 5.1 km || 
|-id=356 bgcolor=#E9E9E9
| 167356 ||  || — || November 18, 2003 || Palomar || NEAT || — || align=right | 2.7 km || 
|-id=357 bgcolor=#E9E9E9
| 167357 ||  || — || November 19, 2003 || Kitt Peak || Spacewatch || — || align=right | 2.2 km || 
|-id=358 bgcolor=#E9E9E9
| 167358 ||  || — || November 19, 2003 || Kitt Peak || Spacewatch || — || align=right | 4.3 km || 
|-id=359 bgcolor=#E9E9E9
| 167359 ||  || — || November 19, 2003 || Socorro || LINEAR || — || align=right | 4.1 km || 
|-id=360 bgcolor=#E9E9E9
| 167360 ||  || — || November 19, 2003 || Kitt Peak || Spacewatch || — || align=right | 2.6 km || 
|-id=361 bgcolor=#E9E9E9
| 167361 ||  || — || November 21, 2003 || Socorro || LINEAR || — || align=right | 2.3 km || 
|-id=362 bgcolor=#E9E9E9
| 167362 ||  || — || November 19, 2003 || Palomar || NEAT || — || align=right | 2.8 km || 
|-id=363 bgcolor=#E9E9E9
| 167363 ||  || — || November 18, 2003 || Catalina || CSS || PAD || align=right | 4.4 km || 
|-id=364 bgcolor=#d6d6d6
| 167364 ||  || — || November 18, 2003 || Palomar || NEAT || — || align=right | 5.0 km || 
|-id=365 bgcolor=#E9E9E9
| 167365 ||  || — || November 19, 2003 || Catalina || CSS || — || align=right | 2.2 km || 
|-id=366 bgcolor=#E9E9E9
| 167366 ||  || — || November 19, 2003 || Socorro || LINEAR || — || align=right | 2.8 km || 
|-id=367 bgcolor=#E9E9E9
| 167367 ||  || — || November 20, 2003 || Socorro || LINEAR || — || align=right | 3.1 km || 
|-id=368 bgcolor=#E9E9E9
| 167368 ||  || — || November 18, 2003 || Kitt Peak || Spacewatch || — || align=right | 3.4 km || 
|-id=369 bgcolor=#E9E9E9
| 167369 ||  || — || November 18, 2003 || Palomar || NEAT || — || align=right | 1.5 km || 
|-id=370 bgcolor=#E9E9E9
| 167370 ||  || — || November 19, 2003 || Kitt Peak || Spacewatch || — || align=right | 1.7 km || 
|-id=371 bgcolor=#E9E9E9
| 167371 ||  || — || November 19, 2003 || Kitt Peak || Spacewatch || — || align=right | 2.5 km || 
|-id=372 bgcolor=#d6d6d6
| 167372 ||  || — || November 19, 2003 || Kitt Peak || Spacewatch || KOR || align=right | 2.1 km || 
|-id=373 bgcolor=#d6d6d6
| 167373 ||  || — || November 19, 2003 || Kitt Peak || Spacewatch || — || align=right | 3.8 km || 
|-id=374 bgcolor=#E9E9E9
| 167374 ||  || — || November 19, 2003 || Kitt Peak || Spacewatch || — || align=right | 3.1 km || 
|-id=375 bgcolor=#E9E9E9
| 167375 ||  || — || November 19, 2003 || Socorro || LINEAR || — || align=right | 3.7 km || 
|-id=376 bgcolor=#E9E9E9
| 167376 ||  || — || November 19, 2003 || Kitt Peak || Spacewatch || — || align=right | 2.5 km || 
|-id=377 bgcolor=#E9E9E9
| 167377 ||  || — || November 19, 2003 || Kitt Peak || Spacewatch || — || align=right | 2.3 km || 
|-id=378 bgcolor=#E9E9E9
| 167378 ||  || — || November 19, 2003 || Kitt Peak || Spacewatch || — || align=right | 4.4 km || 
|-id=379 bgcolor=#E9E9E9
| 167379 ||  || — || November 19, 2003 || Kitt Peak || Spacewatch || — || align=right | 2.9 km || 
|-id=380 bgcolor=#E9E9E9
| 167380 ||  || — || November 19, 2003 || Kitt Peak || Spacewatch || — || align=right | 2.0 km || 
|-id=381 bgcolor=#E9E9E9
| 167381 ||  || — || November 20, 2003 || Socorro || LINEAR || — || align=right | 1.7 km || 
|-id=382 bgcolor=#E9E9E9
| 167382 ||  || — || November 20, 2003 || Socorro || LINEAR || — || align=right | 2.2 km || 
|-id=383 bgcolor=#E9E9E9
| 167383 ||  || — || November 20, 2003 || Socorro || LINEAR || — || align=right | 2.6 km || 
|-id=384 bgcolor=#E9E9E9
| 167384 ||  || — || November 20, 2003 || Socorro || LINEAR || ADE || align=right | 4.1 km || 
|-id=385 bgcolor=#E9E9E9
| 167385 ||  || — || November 20, 2003 || Socorro || LINEAR || — || align=right | 1.8 km || 
|-id=386 bgcolor=#E9E9E9
| 167386 ||  || — || November 20, 2003 || Socorro || LINEAR || — || align=right | 2.3 km || 
|-id=387 bgcolor=#d6d6d6
| 167387 ||  || — || November 20, 2003 || Socorro || LINEAR || — || align=right | 5.3 km || 
|-id=388 bgcolor=#E9E9E9
| 167388 ||  || — || November 19, 2003 || Catalina || CSS || — || align=right | 5.1 km || 
|-id=389 bgcolor=#E9E9E9
| 167389 ||  || — || November 23, 2003 || Needville || Needville Obs. || — || align=right | 2.7 km || 
|-id=390 bgcolor=#E9E9E9
| 167390 ||  || — || November 16, 2003 || Kitt Peak || Spacewatch || — || align=right | 2.3 km || 
|-id=391 bgcolor=#E9E9E9
| 167391 ||  || — || November 18, 2003 || Kitt Peak || Spacewatch || — || align=right | 3.5 km || 
|-id=392 bgcolor=#E9E9E9
| 167392 ||  || — || November 19, 2003 || Anderson Mesa || LONEOS || — || align=right | 1.8 km || 
|-id=393 bgcolor=#E9E9E9
| 167393 ||  || — || November 19, 2003 || Anderson Mesa || LONEOS || — || align=right | 2.5 km || 
|-id=394 bgcolor=#E9E9E9
| 167394 ||  || — || November 19, 2003 || Anderson Mesa || LONEOS || — || align=right | 2.8 km || 
|-id=395 bgcolor=#E9E9E9
| 167395 ||  || — || November 19, 2003 || Anderson Mesa || LONEOS || ADE || align=right | 5.7 km || 
|-id=396 bgcolor=#d6d6d6
| 167396 ||  || — || November 20, 2003 || Socorro || LINEAR || — || align=right | 5.0 km || 
|-id=397 bgcolor=#d6d6d6
| 167397 ||  || — || November 20, 2003 || Socorro || LINEAR || — || align=right | 5.2 km || 
|-id=398 bgcolor=#E9E9E9
| 167398 ||  || — || November 21, 2003 || Catalina || CSS || — || align=right | 2.0 km || 
|-id=399 bgcolor=#E9E9E9
| 167399 ||  || — || November 21, 2003 || Socorro || LINEAR || fast? || align=right | 2.6 km || 
|-id=400 bgcolor=#E9E9E9
| 167400 ||  || — || November 21, 2003 || Socorro || LINEAR || AGN || align=right | 1.9 km || 
|}

167401–167500 

|-bgcolor=#E9E9E9
| 167401 ||  || — || November 20, 2003 || Socorro || LINEAR || AGN || align=right | 1.7 km || 
|-id=402 bgcolor=#E9E9E9
| 167402 ||  || — || November 20, 2003 || Socorro || LINEAR || EUN || align=right | 2.8 km || 
|-id=403 bgcolor=#E9E9E9
| 167403 ||  || — || November 20, 2003 || Socorro || LINEAR || — || align=right | 3.2 km || 
|-id=404 bgcolor=#E9E9E9
| 167404 ||  || — || November 20, 2003 || Socorro || LINEAR || — || align=right | 2.4 km || 
|-id=405 bgcolor=#E9E9E9
| 167405 ||  || — || November 20, 2003 || Socorro || LINEAR || — || align=right | 2.5 km || 
|-id=406 bgcolor=#E9E9E9
| 167406 ||  || — || November 20, 2003 || Socorro || LINEAR || — || align=right | 1.8 km || 
|-id=407 bgcolor=#E9E9E9
| 167407 ||  || — || November 20, 2003 || Socorro || LINEAR || — || align=right | 4.9 km || 
|-id=408 bgcolor=#E9E9E9
| 167408 ||  || — || November 20, 2003 || Socorro || LINEAR || — || align=right | 3.0 km || 
|-id=409 bgcolor=#E9E9E9
| 167409 ||  || — || November 20, 2003 || Socorro || LINEAR || — || align=right | 1.5 km || 
|-id=410 bgcolor=#E9E9E9
| 167410 ||  || — || November 20, 2003 || Socorro || LINEAR || GEF || align=right | 2.2 km || 
|-id=411 bgcolor=#E9E9E9
| 167411 ||  || — || November 21, 2003 || Palomar || NEAT || WIT || align=right | 1.7 km || 
|-id=412 bgcolor=#E9E9E9
| 167412 ||  || — || November 21, 2003 || Palomar || NEAT || XIZ || align=right | 1.9 km || 
|-id=413 bgcolor=#E9E9E9
| 167413 ||  || — || November 19, 2003 || Kitt Peak || Spacewatch || — || align=right | 1.7 km || 
|-id=414 bgcolor=#E9E9E9
| 167414 ||  || — || November 21, 2003 || Socorro || LINEAR || — || align=right | 3.9 km || 
|-id=415 bgcolor=#E9E9E9
| 167415 ||  || — || November 21, 2003 || Socorro || LINEAR || — || align=right | 2.4 km || 
|-id=416 bgcolor=#E9E9E9
| 167416 ||  || — || November 21, 2003 || Socorro || LINEAR || — || align=right | 2.5 km || 
|-id=417 bgcolor=#E9E9E9
| 167417 ||  || — || November 21, 2003 || Socorro || LINEAR || EUN || align=right | 2.9 km || 
|-id=418 bgcolor=#E9E9E9
| 167418 ||  || — || November 21, 2003 || Socorro || LINEAR || EUN || align=right | 2.9 km || 
|-id=419 bgcolor=#E9E9E9
| 167419 ||  || — || November 21, 2003 || Socorro || LINEAR || — || align=right | 1.7 km || 
|-id=420 bgcolor=#E9E9E9
| 167420 ||  || — || November 20, 2003 || Socorro || LINEAR || — || align=right | 2.1 km || 
|-id=421 bgcolor=#E9E9E9
| 167421 ||  || — || November 20, 2003 || Socorro || LINEAR || — || align=right | 3.8 km || 
|-id=422 bgcolor=#E9E9E9
| 167422 ||  || — || November 24, 2003 || Palomar || NEAT || MAR || align=right | 1.8 km || 
|-id=423 bgcolor=#E9E9E9
| 167423 ||  || — || November 24, 2003 || Palomar || NEAT || — || align=right | 3.5 km || 
|-id=424 bgcolor=#E9E9E9
| 167424 ||  || — || November 24, 2003 || Anderson Mesa || LONEOS || — || align=right | 3.3 km || 
|-id=425 bgcolor=#E9E9E9
| 167425 ||  || — || November 26, 2003 || Anderson Mesa || LONEOS || EUN || align=right | 1.9 km || 
|-id=426 bgcolor=#E9E9E9
| 167426 ||  || — || November 26, 2003 || Kitt Peak || Spacewatch || ADE || align=right | 3.3 km || 
|-id=427 bgcolor=#E9E9E9
| 167427 ||  || — || November 26, 2003 || Kitt Peak || Spacewatch || KRM || align=right | 3.3 km || 
|-id=428 bgcolor=#E9E9E9
| 167428 ||  || — || November 26, 2003 || Kitt Peak || Spacewatch || — || align=right | 2.5 km || 
|-id=429 bgcolor=#E9E9E9
| 167429 ||  || — || November 28, 2003 || Goodricke-Pigott || R. A. Tucker || — || align=right | 2.8 km || 
|-id=430 bgcolor=#E9E9E9
| 167430 ||  || — || November 30, 2003 || Kitt Peak || Spacewatch || — || align=right | 2.5 km || 
|-id=431 bgcolor=#E9E9E9
| 167431 ||  || — || November 30, 2003 || Kitt Peak || Spacewatch || — || align=right | 3.2 km || 
|-id=432 bgcolor=#d6d6d6
| 167432 ||  || — || November 30, 2003 || Kitt Peak || Spacewatch || KOR || align=right | 1.5 km || 
|-id=433 bgcolor=#E9E9E9
| 167433 ||  || — || November 19, 2003 || Palomar || NEAT || — || align=right | 2.9 km || 
|-id=434 bgcolor=#E9E9E9
| 167434 ||  || — || November 20, 2003 || Palomar || NEAT || — || align=right | 5.5 km || 
|-id=435 bgcolor=#d6d6d6
| 167435 ||  || — || November 23, 2003 || Anderson Mesa || LONEOS || — || align=right | 4.8 km || 
|-id=436 bgcolor=#d6d6d6
| 167436 ||  || — || November 19, 2003 || Anderson Mesa || LONEOS || K-2 || align=right | 2.0 km || 
|-id=437 bgcolor=#E9E9E9
| 167437 ||  || — || November 19, 2003 || Socorro || LINEAR || DOR || align=right | 3.0 km || 
|-id=438 bgcolor=#E9E9E9
| 167438 ||  || — || November 26, 2003 || Socorro || LINEAR || HNS || align=right | 2.0 km || 
|-id=439 bgcolor=#E9E9E9
| 167439 ||  || — || November 18, 2003 || Kitt Peak || Spacewatch || — || align=right | 3.3 km || 
|-id=440 bgcolor=#E9E9E9
| 167440 ||  || — || December 1, 2003 || Socorro || LINEAR || — || align=right | 2.3 km || 
|-id=441 bgcolor=#E9E9E9
| 167441 ||  || — || December 3, 2003 || Socorro || LINEAR || — || align=right | 4.9 km || 
|-id=442 bgcolor=#E9E9E9
| 167442 ||  || — || December 3, 2003 || Socorro || LINEAR || — || align=right | 3.5 km || 
|-id=443 bgcolor=#E9E9E9
| 167443 ||  || — || December 3, 2003 || Anderson Mesa || LONEOS || — || align=right | 5.2 km || 
|-id=444 bgcolor=#E9E9E9
| 167444 ||  || — || December 1, 2003 || Socorro || LINEAR || HNS || align=right | 2.2 km || 
|-id=445 bgcolor=#E9E9E9
| 167445 ||  || — || December 1, 2003 || Socorro || LINEAR || — || align=right | 2.3 km || 
|-id=446 bgcolor=#E9E9E9
| 167446 ||  || — || December 4, 2003 || Socorro || LINEAR || — || align=right | 3.1 km || 
|-id=447 bgcolor=#E9E9E9
| 167447 ||  || — || December 4, 2003 || Socorro || LINEAR || — || align=right | 2.7 km || 
|-id=448 bgcolor=#E9E9E9
| 167448 ||  || — || December 4, 2003 || Socorro || LINEAR || JNS || align=right | 3.4 km || 
|-id=449 bgcolor=#E9E9E9
| 167449 ||  || — || December 4, 2003 || Socorro || LINEAR || — || align=right | 3.3 km || 
|-id=450 bgcolor=#E9E9E9
| 167450 ||  || — || December 4, 2003 || Socorro || LINEAR || ADE || align=right | 3.0 km || 
|-id=451 bgcolor=#E9E9E9
| 167451 ||  || — || December 4, 2003 || Socorro || LINEAR || — || align=right | 2.2 km || 
|-id=452 bgcolor=#d6d6d6
| 167452 ||  || — || December 14, 2003 || Kitt Peak || Spacewatch || THM || align=right | 4.4 km || 
|-id=453 bgcolor=#E9E9E9
| 167453 ||  || — || December 1, 2003 || Socorro || LINEAR || — || align=right | 1.6 km || 
|-id=454 bgcolor=#d6d6d6
| 167454 ||  || — || December 3, 2003 || Socorro || LINEAR || — || align=right | 4.6 km || 
|-id=455 bgcolor=#E9E9E9
| 167455 ||  || — || December 4, 2003 || Socorro || LINEAR || — || align=right | 1.8 km || 
|-id=456 bgcolor=#d6d6d6
| 167456 || 2003 YP || — || December 16, 2003 || Anderson Mesa || LONEOS || — || align=right | 3.8 km || 
|-id=457 bgcolor=#d6d6d6
| 167457 ||  || — || December 17, 2003 || Anderson Mesa || LONEOS || URS || align=right | 5.6 km || 
|-id=458 bgcolor=#E9E9E9
| 167458 ||  || — || December 18, 2003 || Socorro || LINEAR || — || align=right | 4.6 km || 
|-id=459 bgcolor=#E9E9E9
| 167459 ||  || — || December 17, 2003 || Socorro || LINEAR || — || align=right | 5.4 km || 
|-id=460 bgcolor=#E9E9E9
| 167460 ||  || — || December 18, 2003 || Socorro || LINEAR || — || align=right | 6.9 km || 
|-id=461 bgcolor=#d6d6d6
| 167461 ||  || — || December 17, 2003 || Anderson Mesa || LONEOS || — || align=right | 4.6 km || 
|-id=462 bgcolor=#E9E9E9
| 167462 ||  || — || December 17, 2003 || Kitt Peak || Spacewatch || AGN || align=right | 2.0 km || 
|-id=463 bgcolor=#E9E9E9
| 167463 ||  || — || December 17, 2003 || Kitt Peak || Spacewatch || — || align=right | 3.2 km || 
|-id=464 bgcolor=#fefefe
| 167464 ||  || — || December 17, 2003 || Kitt Peak || Spacewatch || SUL || align=right | 3.2 km || 
|-id=465 bgcolor=#d6d6d6
| 167465 ||  || — || December 17, 2003 || Kitt Peak || Spacewatch || — || align=right | 4.1 km || 
|-id=466 bgcolor=#E9E9E9
| 167466 ||  || — || December 17, 2003 || Socorro || LINEAR || EUN || align=right | 2.3 km || 
|-id=467 bgcolor=#d6d6d6
| 167467 ||  || — || December 16, 2003 || Anderson Mesa || LONEOS || — || align=right | 5.4 km || 
|-id=468 bgcolor=#E9E9E9
| 167468 ||  || — || December 17, 2003 || Kitt Peak || Spacewatch || — || align=right | 2.9 km || 
|-id=469 bgcolor=#E9E9E9
| 167469 ||  || — || December 17, 2003 || Kitt Peak || Spacewatch || — || align=right | 1.9 km || 
|-id=470 bgcolor=#E9E9E9
| 167470 ||  || — || December 19, 2003 || Socorro || LINEAR || — || align=right | 2.5 km || 
|-id=471 bgcolor=#d6d6d6
| 167471 ||  || — || December 19, 2003 || Kitt Peak || Spacewatch || — || align=right | 4.7 km || 
|-id=472 bgcolor=#E9E9E9
| 167472 ||  || — || December 19, 2003 || Kitt Peak || Spacewatch || — || align=right | 2.7 km || 
|-id=473 bgcolor=#E9E9E9
| 167473 ||  || — || December 19, 2003 || Kitt Peak || Spacewatch || — || align=right | 5.6 km || 
|-id=474 bgcolor=#E9E9E9
| 167474 ||  || — || December 19, 2003 || Kitt Peak || Spacewatch || MRX || align=right | 3.5 km || 
|-id=475 bgcolor=#d6d6d6
| 167475 ||  || — || December 19, 2003 || Kitt Peak || Spacewatch || — || align=right | 6.9 km || 
|-id=476 bgcolor=#E9E9E9
| 167476 ||  || — || December 18, 2003 || Socorro || LINEAR || — || align=right | 3.2 km || 
|-id=477 bgcolor=#d6d6d6
| 167477 ||  || — || December 18, 2003 || Socorro || LINEAR || — || align=right | 3.6 km || 
|-id=478 bgcolor=#d6d6d6
| 167478 ||  || — || December 18, 2003 || Kitt Peak || Spacewatch || EOS || align=right | 3.1 km || 
|-id=479 bgcolor=#E9E9E9
| 167479 ||  || — || December 19, 2003 || Socorro || LINEAR || NEM || align=right | 3.8 km || 
|-id=480 bgcolor=#E9E9E9
| 167480 ||  || — || December 19, 2003 || Socorro || LINEAR || VIB || align=right | 2.5 km || 
|-id=481 bgcolor=#E9E9E9
| 167481 ||  || — || December 19, 2003 || Socorro || LINEAR || — || align=right | 3.4 km || 
|-id=482 bgcolor=#E9E9E9
| 167482 ||  || — || December 19, 2003 || Socorro || LINEAR || — || align=right | 2.9 km || 
|-id=483 bgcolor=#E9E9E9
| 167483 ||  || — || December 19, 2003 || Socorro || LINEAR || — || align=right | 3.7 km || 
|-id=484 bgcolor=#E9E9E9
| 167484 ||  || — || December 19, 2003 || Socorro || LINEAR || — || align=right | 4.7 km || 
|-id=485 bgcolor=#E9E9E9
| 167485 ||  || — || December 19, 2003 || Socorro || LINEAR || — || align=right | 4.4 km || 
|-id=486 bgcolor=#E9E9E9
| 167486 ||  || — || December 19, 2003 || Socorro || LINEAR || — || align=right | 4.0 km || 
|-id=487 bgcolor=#E9E9E9
| 167487 ||  || — || December 19, 2003 || Socorro || LINEAR || — || align=right | 4.5 km || 
|-id=488 bgcolor=#E9E9E9
| 167488 ||  || — || December 20, 2003 || Socorro || LINEAR || — || align=right | 5.4 km || 
|-id=489 bgcolor=#E9E9E9
| 167489 ||  || — || December 18, 2003 || Socorro || LINEAR || MIS || align=right | 4.3 km || 
|-id=490 bgcolor=#E9E9E9
| 167490 ||  || — || December 18, 2003 || Socorro || LINEAR || — || align=right | 2.9 km || 
|-id=491 bgcolor=#E9E9E9
| 167491 ||  || — || December 18, 2003 || Socorro || LINEAR || — || align=right | 4.3 km || 
|-id=492 bgcolor=#E9E9E9
| 167492 ||  || — || December 18, 2003 || Socorro || LINEAR || — || align=right | 4.5 km || 
|-id=493 bgcolor=#E9E9E9
| 167493 ||  || — || December 18, 2003 || Haleakala || NEAT || — || align=right | 1.8 km || 
|-id=494 bgcolor=#E9E9E9
| 167494 ||  || — || December 19, 2003 || Kitt Peak || Spacewatch || — || align=right | 2.5 km || 
|-id=495 bgcolor=#E9E9E9
| 167495 ||  || — || December 19, 2003 || Socorro || LINEAR || — || align=right | 4.4 km || 
|-id=496 bgcolor=#E9E9E9
| 167496 ||  || — || December 19, 2003 || Socorro || LINEAR || — || align=right | 6.3 km || 
|-id=497 bgcolor=#E9E9E9
| 167497 ||  || — || December 19, 2003 || Socorro || LINEAR || — || align=right | 2.2 km || 
|-id=498 bgcolor=#E9E9E9
| 167498 ||  || — || December 19, 2003 || Socorro || LINEAR || GER || align=right | 3.6 km || 
|-id=499 bgcolor=#E9E9E9
| 167499 ||  || — || December 19, 2003 || Socorro || LINEAR || GEF || align=right | 2.7 km || 
|-id=500 bgcolor=#E9E9E9
| 167500 ||  || — || December 19, 2003 || Kitt Peak || Spacewatch || — || align=right | 5.2 km || 
|}

167501–167600 

|-bgcolor=#E9E9E9
| 167501 ||  || — || December 19, 2003 || Kitt Peak || Spacewatch || MRX || align=right | 2.1 km || 
|-id=502 bgcolor=#E9E9E9
| 167502 ||  || — || December 20, 2003 || Socorro || LINEAR || — || align=right | 3.4 km || 
|-id=503 bgcolor=#E9E9E9
| 167503 ||  || — || December 21, 2003 || Socorro || LINEAR || HEN || align=right | 2.0 km || 
|-id=504 bgcolor=#E9E9E9
| 167504 ||  || — || December 19, 2003 || Socorro || LINEAR || — || align=right | 1.8 km || 
|-id=505 bgcolor=#d6d6d6
| 167505 ||  || — || December 20, 2003 || Socorro || LINEAR || ALA || align=right | 8.7 km || 
|-id=506 bgcolor=#E9E9E9
| 167506 ||  || — || December 21, 2003 || Catalina || CSS || — || align=right | 3.3 km || 
|-id=507 bgcolor=#E9E9E9
| 167507 ||  || — || December 22, 2003 || Socorro || LINEAR || — || align=right | 2.4 km || 
|-id=508 bgcolor=#E9E9E9
| 167508 ||  || — || December 17, 2003 || Socorro || LINEAR || WIT || align=right | 1.7 km || 
|-id=509 bgcolor=#E9E9E9
| 167509 ||  || — || December 23, 2003 || Socorro || LINEAR || MAR || align=right | 2.6 km || 
|-id=510 bgcolor=#E9E9E9
| 167510 ||  || — || December 25, 2003 || Socorro || LINEAR || — || align=right | 3.9 km || 
|-id=511 bgcolor=#d6d6d6
| 167511 ||  || — || December 27, 2003 || Socorro || LINEAR || — || align=right | 5.2 km || 
|-id=512 bgcolor=#E9E9E9
| 167512 ||  || — || December 27, 2003 || Socorro || LINEAR || — || align=right | 3.8 km || 
|-id=513 bgcolor=#d6d6d6
| 167513 ||  || — || December 27, 2003 || Socorro || LINEAR || — || align=right | 3.7 km || 
|-id=514 bgcolor=#E9E9E9
| 167514 ||  || — || December 28, 2003 || Socorro || LINEAR || — || align=right | 3.3 km || 
|-id=515 bgcolor=#d6d6d6
| 167515 ||  || — || December 27, 2003 || Socorro || LINEAR || — || align=right | 4.6 km || 
|-id=516 bgcolor=#E9E9E9
| 167516 ||  || — || December 27, 2003 || Socorro || LINEAR || — || align=right | 4.4 km || 
|-id=517 bgcolor=#E9E9E9
| 167517 ||  || — || December 28, 2003 || Socorro || LINEAR || — || align=right | 3.1 km || 
|-id=518 bgcolor=#d6d6d6
| 167518 ||  || — || December 28, 2003 || Kitt Peak || Spacewatch || THM || align=right | 4.3 km || 
|-id=519 bgcolor=#d6d6d6
| 167519 ||  || — || December 28, 2003 || Socorro || LINEAR || EOS || align=right | 4.0 km || 
|-id=520 bgcolor=#E9E9E9
| 167520 ||  || — || December 28, 2003 || Socorro || LINEAR || — || align=right | 4.4 km || 
|-id=521 bgcolor=#E9E9E9
| 167521 ||  || — || December 29, 2003 || Socorro || LINEAR || 526 || align=right | 4.0 km || 
|-id=522 bgcolor=#E9E9E9
| 167522 ||  || — || December 29, 2003 || Socorro || LINEAR || — || align=right | 4.1 km || 
|-id=523 bgcolor=#E9E9E9
| 167523 ||  || — || December 29, 2003 || Socorro || LINEAR || — || align=right | 4.0 km || 
|-id=524 bgcolor=#E9E9E9
| 167524 ||  || — || December 29, 2003 || Socorro || LINEAR || — || align=right | 2.9 km || 
|-id=525 bgcolor=#d6d6d6
| 167525 ||  || — || December 29, 2003 || Catalina || CSS || — || align=right | 5.8 km || 
|-id=526 bgcolor=#E9E9E9
| 167526 ||  || — || December 29, 2003 || Socorro || LINEAR || — || align=right | 4.0 km || 
|-id=527 bgcolor=#E9E9E9
| 167527 ||  || — || December 29, 2003 || Catalina || CSS || EUN || align=right | 2.5 km || 
|-id=528 bgcolor=#E9E9E9
| 167528 ||  || — || December 29, 2003 || Catalina || CSS || EUN || align=right | 2.7 km || 
|-id=529 bgcolor=#d6d6d6
| 167529 ||  || — || December 29, 2003 || Catalina || CSS || — || align=right | 6.6 km || 
|-id=530 bgcolor=#d6d6d6
| 167530 ||  || — || December 29, 2003 || Catalina || CSS || — || align=right | 6.2 km || 
|-id=531 bgcolor=#d6d6d6
| 167531 ||  || — || December 26, 2003 || Haleakala || NEAT || — || align=right | 4.9 km || 
|-id=532 bgcolor=#E9E9E9
| 167532 ||  || — || December 30, 2003 || Socorro || LINEAR || INO || align=right | 2.1 km || 
|-id=533 bgcolor=#E9E9E9
| 167533 ||  || — || December 17, 2003 || Socorro || LINEAR || — || align=right | 3.4 km || 
|-id=534 bgcolor=#E9E9E9
| 167534 ||  || — || December 17, 2003 || Kitt Peak || Spacewatch || DOR || align=right | 5.3 km || 
|-id=535 bgcolor=#E9E9E9
| 167535 ||  || — || December 17, 2003 || Socorro || LINEAR || — || align=right | 5.6 km || 
|-id=536 bgcolor=#d6d6d6
| 167536 ||  || — || December 18, 2003 || Socorro || LINEAR || — || align=right | 4.3 km || 
|-id=537 bgcolor=#E9E9E9
| 167537 ||  || — || December 21, 2003 || Catalina || CSS || GEF || align=right | 2.0 km || 
|-id=538 bgcolor=#d6d6d6
| 167538 ||  || — || January 12, 2004 || Palomar || NEAT || — || align=right | 5.4 km || 
|-id=539 bgcolor=#d6d6d6
| 167539 ||  || — || January 13, 2004 || Anderson Mesa || LONEOS || — || align=right | 4.5 km || 
|-id=540 bgcolor=#d6d6d6
| 167540 ||  || — || January 15, 2004 || Kitt Peak || Spacewatch || — || align=right | 5.4 km || 
|-id=541 bgcolor=#d6d6d6
| 167541 ||  || — || January 13, 2004 || Anderson Mesa || LONEOS || — || align=right | 4.4 km || 
|-id=542 bgcolor=#d6d6d6
| 167542 ||  || — || January 15, 2004 || Kitt Peak || Spacewatch || — || align=right | 4.2 km || 
|-id=543 bgcolor=#E9E9E9
| 167543 ||  || — || January 3, 2004 || Socorro || LINEAR || HNS || align=right | 2.4 km || 
|-id=544 bgcolor=#d6d6d6
| 167544 ||  || — || January 12, 2004 || Palomar || NEAT || — || align=right | 4.8 km || 
|-id=545 bgcolor=#d6d6d6
| 167545 ||  || — || January 13, 2004 || Kitt Peak || Spacewatch || — || align=right | 3.9 km || 
|-id=546 bgcolor=#d6d6d6
| 167546 ||  || — || January 13, 2004 || Kitt Peak || Spacewatch || — || align=right | 4.0 km || 
|-id=547 bgcolor=#d6d6d6
| 167547 ||  || — || January 15, 2004 || Kitt Peak || Spacewatch || EOS || align=right | 4.1 km || 
|-id=548 bgcolor=#d6d6d6
| 167548 ||  || — || January 13, 2004 || Palomar || NEAT || — || align=right | 5.5 km || 
|-id=549 bgcolor=#d6d6d6
| 167549 ||  || — || January 16, 2004 || Kitt Peak || Spacewatch || HYG || align=right | 5.1 km || 
|-id=550 bgcolor=#d6d6d6
| 167550 ||  || — || January 16, 2004 || Palomar || NEAT || — || align=right | 4.0 km || 
|-id=551 bgcolor=#d6d6d6
| 167551 ||  || — || January 17, 2004 || Palomar || NEAT || TEL || align=right | 5.5 km || 
|-id=552 bgcolor=#d6d6d6
| 167552 ||  || — || January 16, 2004 || Palomar || NEAT || EOS || align=right | 5.9 km || 
|-id=553 bgcolor=#E9E9E9
| 167553 ||  || — || January 17, 2004 || Palomar || NEAT || — || align=right | 2.1 km || 
|-id=554 bgcolor=#d6d6d6
| 167554 ||  || — || January 18, 2004 || Palomar || NEAT || — || align=right | 5.1 km || 
|-id=555 bgcolor=#d6d6d6
| 167555 ||  || — || January 17, 2004 || Palomar || NEAT || — || align=right | 6.4 km || 
|-id=556 bgcolor=#d6d6d6
| 167556 ||  || — || January 19, 2004 || Anderson Mesa || LONEOS || — || align=right | 4.4 km || 
|-id=557 bgcolor=#E9E9E9
| 167557 ||  || — || January 19, 2004 || Kitt Peak || Spacewatch || — || align=right | 3.0 km || 
|-id=558 bgcolor=#d6d6d6
| 167558 ||  || — || January 19, 2004 || Kitt Peak || Spacewatch || VER || align=right | 3.6 km || 
|-id=559 bgcolor=#d6d6d6
| 167559 ||  || — || January 19, 2004 || Kitt Peak || Spacewatch || EOS || align=right | 3.1 km || 
|-id=560 bgcolor=#d6d6d6
| 167560 ||  || — || January 19, 2004 || Kitt Peak || Spacewatch || — || align=right | 6.7 km || 
|-id=561 bgcolor=#d6d6d6
| 167561 ||  || — || January 21, 2004 || Socorro || LINEAR || — || align=right | 5.3 km || 
|-id=562 bgcolor=#E9E9E9
| 167562 ||  || — || January 21, 2004 || Socorro || LINEAR || — || align=right | 2.5 km || 
|-id=563 bgcolor=#E9E9E9
| 167563 ||  || — || January 19, 2004 || Socorro || LINEAR || — || align=right | 3.4 km || 
|-id=564 bgcolor=#d6d6d6
| 167564 ||  || — || January 19, 2004 || Catalina || CSS || — || align=right | 5.2 km || 
|-id=565 bgcolor=#d6d6d6
| 167565 ||  || — || January 22, 2004 || Socorro || LINEAR || — || align=right | 4.3 km || 
|-id=566 bgcolor=#E9E9E9
| 167566 ||  || — || January 21, 2004 || Socorro || LINEAR || HOF || align=right | 3.7 km || 
|-id=567 bgcolor=#d6d6d6
| 167567 ||  || — || January 21, 2004 || Socorro || LINEAR || — || align=right | 5.0 km || 
|-id=568 bgcolor=#E9E9E9
| 167568 ||  || — || January 21, 2004 || Socorro || LINEAR || NEM || align=right | 4.5 km || 
|-id=569 bgcolor=#d6d6d6
| 167569 ||  || — || January 21, 2004 || Socorro || LINEAR || — || align=right | 5.1 km || 
|-id=570 bgcolor=#d6d6d6
| 167570 ||  || — || January 21, 2004 || Socorro || LINEAR || THM || align=right | 3.7 km || 
|-id=571 bgcolor=#d6d6d6
| 167571 ||  || — || January 21, 2004 || Socorro || LINEAR || — || align=right | 3.1 km || 
|-id=572 bgcolor=#d6d6d6
| 167572 ||  || — || January 21, 2004 || Socorro || LINEAR || — || align=right | 4.3 km || 
|-id=573 bgcolor=#d6d6d6
| 167573 ||  || — || January 22, 2004 || Socorro || LINEAR || — || align=right | 4.0 km || 
|-id=574 bgcolor=#d6d6d6
| 167574 ||  || — || January 22, 2004 || Socorro || LINEAR || — || align=right | 4.0 km || 
|-id=575 bgcolor=#d6d6d6
| 167575 ||  || — || January 22, 2004 || Socorro || LINEAR || KOR || align=right | 1.9 km || 
|-id=576 bgcolor=#d6d6d6
| 167576 ||  || — || January 19, 2004 || Anderson Mesa || LONEOS || HYG || align=right | 5.2 km || 
|-id=577 bgcolor=#d6d6d6
| 167577 ||  || — || January 22, 2004 || Socorro || LINEAR || — || align=right | 5.0 km || 
|-id=578 bgcolor=#E9E9E9
| 167578 ||  || — || January 23, 2004 || Socorro || LINEAR || — || align=right | 4.7 km || 
|-id=579 bgcolor=#d6d6d6
| 167579 ||  || — || January 24, 2004 || Socorro || LINEAR || 7:4 || align=right | 9.0 km || 
|-id=580 bgcolor=#d6d6d6
| 167580 ||  || — || January 25, 2004 || Haleakala || NEAT || — || align=right | 4.4 km || 
|-id=581 bgcolor=#E9E9E9
| 167581 ||  || — || January 25, 2004 || Haleakala || NEAT || — || align=right | 3.2 km || 
|-id=582 bgcolor=#d6d6d6
| 167582 ||  || — || January 27, 2004 || Anderson Mesa || LONEOS || — || align=right | 4.3 km || 
|-id=583 bgcolor=#d6d6d6
| 167583 ||  || — || January 23, 2004 || Socorro || LINEAR || — || align=right | 5.6 km || 
|-id=584 bgcolor=#E9E9E9
| 167584 ||  || — || January 24, 2004 || Socorro || LINEAR || — || align=right | 4.6 km || 
|-id=585 bgcolor=#d6d6d6
| 167585 ||  || — || January 27, 2004 || Anderson Mesa || LONEOS || — || align=right | 4.2 km || 
|-id=586 bgcolor=#d6d6d6
| 167586 ||  || — || January 28, 2004 || Socorro || LINEAR || — || align=right | 5.4 km || 
|-id=587 bgcolor=#d6d6d6
| 167587 ||  || — || January 28, 2004 || Socorro || LINEAR || — || align=right | 4.1 km || 
|-id=588 bgcolor=#d6d6d6
| 167588 ||  || — || January 28, 2004 || Kitt Peak || Spacewatch || KOR || align=right | 2.4 km || 
|-id=589 bgcolor=#d6d6d6
| 167589 ||  || — || January 23, 2004 || Socorro || LINEAR || EOS || align=right | 6.6 km || 
|-id=590 bgcolor=#d6d6d6
| 167590 ||  || — || January 26, 2004 || Anderson Mesa || LONEOS || — || align=right | 4.9 km || 
|-id=591 bgcolor=#d6d6d6
| 167591 ||  || — || January 26, 2004 || Anderson Mesa || LONEOS || — || align=right | 5.5 km || 
|-id=592 bgcolor=#d6d6d6
| 167592 ||  || — || January 26, 2004 || Anderson Mesa || LONEOS || — || align=right | 6.0 km || 
|-id=593 bgcolor=#d6d6d6
| 167593 ||  || — || January 28, 2004 || Catalina || CSS || EOS || align=right | 3.4 km || 
|-id=594 bgcolor=#d6d6d6
| 167594 ||  || — || January 29, 2004 || Socorro || LINEAR || — || align=right | 3.4 km || 
|-id=595 bgcolor=#d6d6d6
| 167595 ||  || — || January 24, 2004 || Socorro || LINEAR || — || align=right | 4.0 km || 
|-id=596 bgcolor=#d6d6d6
| 167596 ||  || — || January 26, 2004 || Anderson Mesa || LONEOS || — || align=right | 3.6 km || 
|-id=597 bgcolor=#d6d6d6
| 167597 ||  || — || January 27, 2004 || Catalina || CSS || ALA || align=right | 8.8 km || 
|-id=598 bgcolor=#d6d6d6
| 167598 ||  || — || January 28, 2004 || Catalina || CSS || EOS || align=right | 4.9 km || 
|-id=599 bgcolor=#E9E9E9
| 167599 ||  || — || January 29, 2004 || Socorro || LINEAR || — || align=right | 3.0 km || 
|-id=600 bgcolor=#d6d6d6
| 167600 ||  || — || January 31, 2004 || Socorro || LINEAR || AEG || align=right | 5.7 km || 
|}

167601–167700 

|-bgcolor=#d6d6d6
| 167601 ||  || — || January 18, 2004 || Palomar || NEAT || HYG || align=right | 5.0 km || 
|-id=602 bgcolor=#d6d6d6
| 167602 ||  || — || January 19, 2004 || Kitt Peak || Spacewatch || KAR || align=right | 1.4 km || 
|-id=603 bgcolor=#d6d6d6
| 167603 ||  || — || January 19, 2004 || Kitt Peak || Spacewatch || KOR || align=right | 1.9 km || 
|-id=604 bgcolor=#d6d6d6
| 167604 ||  || — || January 22, 2004 || Socorro || LINEAR || — || align=right | 4.0 km || 
|-id=605 bgcolor=#d6d6d6
| 167605 ||  || — || January 18, 2004 || Palomar || NEAT || — || align=right | 3.5 km || 
|-id=606 bgcolor=#d6d6d6
| 167606 ||  || — || January 18, 2004 || Palomar || NEAT || — || align=right | 4.7 km || 
|-id=607 bgcolor=#d6d6d6
| 167607 ||  || — || January 28, 2004 || Kitt Peak || Spacewatch || — || align=right | 4.2 km || 
|-id=608 bgcolor=#E9E9E9
| 167608 ||  || — || February 10, 2004 || Socorro || LINEAR || — || align=right | 5.3 km || 
|-id=609 bgcolor=#d6d6d6
| 167609 ||  || — || February 1, 2004 || Catalina || CSS || — || align=right | 6.3 km || 
|-id=610 bgcolor=#d6d6d6
| 167610 ||  || — || February 11, 2004 || Desert Eagle || W. K. Y. Yeung || EOS || align=right | 3.7 km || 
|-id=611 bgcolor=#d6d6d6
| 167611 ||  || — || February 10, 2004 || Nogales || Tenagra II Obs. || — || align=right | 5.5 km || 
|-id=612 bgcolor=#d6d6d6
| 167612 ||  || — || February 11, 2004 || Kitt Peak || Spacewatch || — || align=right | 3.3 km || 
|-id=613 bgcolor=#d6d6d6
| 167613 ||  || — || February 11, 2004 || Catalina || CSS || — || align=right | 4.5 km || 
|-id=614 bgcolor=#d6d6d6
| 167614 ||  || — || February 11, 2004 || Catalina || CSS || HYG || align=right | 5.9 km || 
|-id=615 bgcolor=#d6d6d6
| 167615 ||  || — || February 11, 2004 || Palomar || NEAT || — || align=right | 5.9 km || 
|-id=616 bgcolor=#d6d6d6
| 167616 ||  || — || February 11, 2004 || Kitt Peak || Spacewatch || — || align=right | 3.6 km || 
|-id=617 bgcolor=#d6d6d6
| 167617 ||  || — || February 11, 2004 || Anderson Mesa || LONEOS || — || align=right | 4.3 km || 
|-id=618 bgcolor=#d6d6d6
| 167618 ||  || — || February 12, 2004 || Palomar || NEAT || — || align=right | 5.5 km || 
|-id=619 bgcolor=#d6d6d6
| 167619 ||  || — || February 13, 2004 || Kitt Peak || Spacewatch || — || align=right | 5.3 km || 
|-id=620 bgcolor=#d6d6d6
| 167620 ||  || — || February 11, 2004 || Palomar || NEAT || NAE || align=right | 5.4 km || 
|-id=621 bgcolor=#d6d6d6
| 167621 ||  || — || February 11, 2004 || Catalina || CSS || — || align=right | 6.4 km || 
|-id=622 bgcolor=#d6d6d6
| 167622 ||  || — || February 12, 2004 || Kitt Peak || Spacewatch || — || align=right | 4.9 km || 
|-id=623 bgcolor=#d6d6d6
| 167623 ||  || — || February 3, 2004 || Haleakala || NEAT || — || align=right | 5.0 km || 
|-id=624 bgcolor=#fefefe
| 167624 ||  || — || February 14, 2004 || Palomar || NEAT || H || align=right | 1.2 km || 
|-id=625 bgcolor=#d6d6d6
| 167625 ||  || — || February 11, 2004 || Palomar || NEAT || 7:4 || align=right | 8.1 km || 
|-id=626 bgcolor=#d6d6d6
| 167626 ||  || — || February 11, 2004 || Palomar || NEAT || — || align=right | 6.1 km || 
|-id=627 bgcolor=#d6d6d6
| 167627 ||  || — || February 12, 2004 || Kitt Peak || Spacewatch || — || align=right | 5.3 km || 
|-id=628 bgcolor=#d6d6d6
| 167628 ||  || — || February 11, 2004 || Palomar || NEAT || EOS || align=right | 3.1 km || 
|-id=629 bgcolor=#d6d6d6
| 167629 ||  || — || February 11, 2004 || Catalina || CSS || — || align=right | 4.5 km || 
|-id=630 bgcolor=#d6d6d6
| 167630 ||  || — || February 11, 2004 || Palomar || NEAT || THM || align=right | 3.1 km || 
|-id=631 bgcolor=#d6d6d6
| 167631 ||  || — || February 11, 2004 || Palomar || NEAT || EOS || align=right | 3.5 km || 
|-id=632 bgcolor=#d6d6d6
| 167632 ||  || — || February 12, 2004 || Kitt Peak || Spacewatch || EOS || align=right | 3.2 km || 
|-id=633 bgcolor=#d6d6d6
| 167633 ||  || — || February 14, 2004 || Palomar || NEAT || — || align=right | 3.7 km || 
|-id=634 bgcolor=#d6d6d6
| 167634 ||  || — || February 13, 2004 || Kitt Peak || Spacewatch || — || align=right | 4.5 km || 
|-id=635 bgcolor=#d6d6d6
| 167635 ||  || — || February 13, 2004 || Anderson Mesa || LONEOS || EOS || align=right | 4.4 km || 
|-id=636 bgcolor=#d6d6d6
| 167636 ||  || — || February 13, 2004 || Anderson Mesa || LONEOS || — || align=right | 4.4 km || 
|-id=637 bgcolor=#d6d6d6
| 167637 ||  || — || February 13, 2004 || Anderson Mesa || LONEOS || EOS || align=right | 3.3 km || 
|-id=638 bgcolor=#d6d6d6
| 167638 ||  || — || February 12, 2004 || Kitt Peak || Spacewatch || KOR || align=right | 2.4 km || 
|-id=639 bgcolor=#d6d6d6
| 167639 ||  || — || February 13, 2004 || Kitt Peak || Spacewatch || — || align=right | 4.2 km || 
|-id=640 bgcolor=#d6d6d6
| 167640 || 2004 DU || — || February 16, 2004 || Kitt Peak || Spacewatch || — || align=right | 4.2 km || 
|-id=641 bgcolor=#E9E9E9
| 167641 ||  || — || February 16, 2004 || Socorro || LINEAR || EUN || align=right | 2.0 km || 
|-id=642 bgcolor=#d6d6d6
| 167642 ||  || — || February 18, 2004 || Desert Eagle || W. K. Y. Yeung || — || align=right | 4.3 km || 
|-id=643 bgcolor=#E9E9E9
| 167643 ||  || — || February 16, 2004 || Kitt Peak || Spacewatch || — || align=right | 1.7 km || 
|-id=644 bgcolor=#d6d6d6
| 167644 ||  || — || February 16, 2004 || Socorro || LINEAR || — || align=right | 3.4 km || 
|-id=645 bgcolor=#d6d6d6
| 167645 ||  || — || February 17, 2004 || Socorro || LINEAR || — || align=right | 4.4 km || 
|-id=646 bgcolor=#d6d6d6
| 167646 ||  || — || February 17, 2004 || Kitt Peak || Spacewatch || — || align=right | 4.7 km || 
|-id=647 bgcolor=#d6d6d6
| 167647 ||  || — || February 19, 2004 || Socorro || LINEAR || — || align=right | 3.8 km || 
|-id=648 bgcolor=#d6d6d6
| 167648 ||  || — || February 18, 2004 || Haleakala || NEAT || — || align=right | 6.6 km || 
|-id=649 bgcolor=#d6d6d6
| 167649 ||  || — || February 23, 2004 || Socorro || LINEAR || — || align=right | 4.8 km || 
|-id=650 bgcolor=#d6d6d6
| 167650 ||  || — || February 19, 2004 || Socorro || LINEAR || EOS || align=right | 4.8 km || 
|-id=651 bgcolor=#d6d6d6
| 167651 ||  || — || February 19, 2004 || Socorro || LINEAR || — || align=right | 3.8 km || 
|-id=652 bgcolor=#E9E9E9
| 167652 ||  || — || February 23, 2004 || Socorro || LINEAR || — || align=right | 3.3 km || 
|-id=653 bgcolor=#d6d6d6
| 167653 ||  || — || February 23, 2004 || Socorro || LINEAR || THM || align=right | 3.6 km || 
|-id=654 bgcolor=#d6d6d6
| 167654 ||  || — || March 10, 2004 || Palomar || NEAT || FIR || align=right | 6.0 km || 
|-id=655 bgcolor=#d6d6d6
| 167655 ||  || — || March 11, 2004 || Palomar || NEAT || TIR || align=right | 4.9 km || 
|-id=656 bgcolor=#d6d6d6
| 167656 ||  || — || March 12, 2004 || Palomar || NEAT || LIX || align=right | 5.8 km || 
|-id=657 bgcolor=#d6d6d6
| 167657 ||  || — || March 11, 2004 || Palomar || NEAT || — || align=right | 5.9 km || 
|-id=658 bgcolor=#d6d6d6
| 167658 ||  || — || March 11, 2004 || Palomar || NEAT || EOS || align=right | 3.5 km || 
|-id=659 bgcolor=#d6d6d6
| 167659 ||  || — || March 13, 2004 || Palomar || NEAT || — || align=right | 7.7 km || 
|-id=660 bgcolor=#d6d6d6
| 167660 ||  || — || March 14, 2004 || Socorro || LINEAR || — || align=right | 5.4 km || 
|-id=661 bgcolor=#d6d6d6
| 167661 ||  || — || March 15, 2004 || Kitt Peak || Spacewatch || — || align=right | 4.4 km || 
|-id=662 bgcolor=#d6d6d6
| 167662 ||  || — || March 13, 2004 || Palomar || NEAT || LUT || align=right | 5.4 km || 
|-id=663 bgcolor=#d6d6d6
| 167663 ||  || — || March 15, 2004 || Kitt Peak || Spacewatch || THM || align=right | 4.5 km || 
|-id=664 bgcolor=#d6d6d6
| 167664 ||  || — || March 15, 2004 || Catalina || CSS || — || align=right | 5.1 km || 
|-id=665 bgcolor=#d6d6d6
| 167665 ||  || — || March 14, 2004 || Socorro || LINEAR || LUT || align=right | 8.2 km || 
|-id=666 bgcolor=#d6d6d6
| 167666 ||  || — || March 15, 2004 || Kitt Peak || Spacewatch || — || align=right | 4.1 km || 
|-id=667 bgcolor=#d6d6d6
| 167667 ||  || — || March 14, 2004 || Kitt Peak || Spacewatch || THM || align=right | 2.9 km || 
|-id=668 bgcolor=#d6d6d6
| 167668 ||  || — || March 15, 2004 || Socorro || LINEAR || HYG || align=right | 4.3 km || 
|-id=669 bgcolor=#d6d6d6
| 167669 ||  || — || March 15, 2004 || Socorro || LINEAR || ALA || align=right | 6.8 km || 
|-id=670 bgcolor=#d6d6d6
| 167670 ||  || — || March 15, 2004 || Socorro || LINEAR || — || align=right | 6.6 km || 
|-id=671 bgcolor=#FA8072
| 167671 ||  || — || March 19, 2004 || Siding Spring || SSS || — || align=right data-sort-value="0.94" | 940 m || 
|-id=672 bgcolor=#E9E9E9
| 167672 ||  || — || March 24, 2004 || Bergisch Gladbach || W. Bickel || — || align=right | 2.4 km || 
|-id=673 bgcolor=#d6d6d6
| 167673 ||  || — || March 16, 2004 || Socorro || LINEAR || — || align=right | 6.3 km || 
|-id=674 bgcolor=#d6d6d6
| 167674 ||  || — || March 16, 2004 || Catalina || CSS || — || align=right | 7.8 km || 
|-id=675 bgcolor=#d6d6d6
| 167675 ||  || — || March 23, 2004 || Socorro || LINEAR || EUP || align=right | 5.8 km || 
|-id=676 bgcolor=#d6d6d6
| 167676 ||  || — || March 26, 2004 || Socorro || LINEAR || — || align=right | 7.1 km || 
|-id=677 bgcolor=#E9E9E9
| 167677 ||  || — || March 28, 2004 || Haleakala || NEAT || — || align=right | 2.3 km || 
|-id=678 bgcolor=#d6d6d6
| 167678 ||  || — || April 9, 2004 || Catalina || CSS || Tj (2.99) || align=right | 5.9 km || 
|-id=679 bgcolor=#E9E9E9
| 167679 ||  || — || April 10, 2004 || Palomar || NEAT || — || align=right | 3.7 km || 
|-id=680 bgcolor=#d6d6d6
| 167680 ||  || — || April 13, 2004 || Kitt Peak || Spacewatch || — || align=right | 4.8 km || 
|-id=681 bgcolor=#d6d6d6
| 167681 ||  || — || April 12, 2004 || Palomar || NEAT || LIX || align=right | 4.6 km || 
|-id=682 bgcolor=#d6d6d6
| 167682 ||  || — || April 16, 2004 || Socorro || LINEAR || — || align=right | 4.6 km || 
|-id=683 bgcolor=#d6d6d6
| 167683 ||  || — || April 22, 2004 || Desert Eagle || W. K. Y. Yeung || — || align=right | 3.9 km || 
|-id=684 bgcolor=#E9E9E9
| 167684 ||  || — || April 23, 2004 || Siding Spring || SSS || — || align=right | 4.6 km || 
|-id=685 bgcolor=#d6d6d6
| 167685 || 2004 JQ || — || May 9, 2004 || Catalina || CSS || — || align=right | 6.2 km || 
|-id=686 bgcolor=#C2FFFF
| 167686 ||  || — || May 14, 2004 || Campo Imperatore || CINEOS || L4 || align=right | 18 km || 
|-id=687 bgcolor=#FA8072
| 167687 || 2004 LX || — || June 9, 2004 || Anderson Mesa || LONEOS || H || align=right | 1.00 km || 
|-id=688 bgcolor=#d6d6d6
| 167688 ||  || — || June 9, 2004 || Siding Spring || SSS || — || align=right | 8.1 km || 
|-id=689 bgcolor=#fefefe
| 167689 || 2004 OL || — || July 16, 2004 || Socorro || LINEAR || H || align=right | 1.0 km || 
|-id=690 bgcolor=#fefefe
| 167690 ||  || — || August 10, 2004 || Anderson Mesa || LONEOS || H || align=right data-sort-value="0.90" | 900 m || 
|-id=691 bgcolor=#fefefe
| 167691 ||  || — || August 20, 2004 || Siding Spring || SSS || H || align=right data-sort-value="0.99" | 990 m || 
|-id=692 bgcolor=#fefefe
| 167692 ||  || — || August 25, 2004 || Socorro || LINEAR || H || align=right | 1.1 km || 
|-id=693 bgcolor=#fefefe
| 167693 ||  || — || August 25, 2004 || Socorro || LINEAR || H || align=right data-sort-value="0.92" | 920 m || 
|-id=694 bgcolor=#fefefe
| 167694 ||  || — || August 20, 2004 || Catalina || CSS || — || align=right | 1.4 km || 
|-id=695 bgcolor=#fefefe
| 167695 ||  || — || September 8, 2004 || Socorro || LINEAR || H || align=right data-sort-value="0.87" | 870 m || 
|-id=696 bgcolor=#fefefe
| 167696 ||  || — || September 10, 2004 || Socorro || LINEAR || — || align=right | 1.3 km || 
|-id=697 bgcolor=#fefefe
| 167697 ||  || — || September 6, 2004 || Palomar || NEAT || H || align=right data-sort-value="0.78" | 780 m || 
|-id=698 bgcolor=#fefefe
| 167698 ||  || — || September 17, 2004 || Socorro || LINEAR || FLO || align=right data-sort-value="0.95" | 950 m || 
|-id=699 bgcolor=#fefefe
| 167699 ||  || — || September 22, 2004 || Socorro || LINEAR || FLO || align=right data-sort-value="0.88" | 880 m || 
|-id=700 bgcolor=#fefefe
| 167700 ||  || — || September 16, 2004 || Anderson Mesa || LONEOS || — || align=right | 1.8 km || 
|}

167701–167800 

|-bgcolor=#FA8072
| 167701 ||  || — || October 8, 2004 || Socorro || LINEAR || — || align=right | 1.4 km || 
|-id=702 bgcolor=#fefefe
| 167702 ||  || — || October 4, 2004 || Kitt Peak || Spacewatch || — || align=right | 1.0 km || 
|-id=703 bgcolor=#fefefe
| 167703 ||  || — || October 4, 2004 || Kitt Peak || Spacewatch || — || align=right | 1.5 km || 
|-id=704 bgcolor=#fefefe
| 167704 ||  || — || October 5, 2004 || Kitt Peak || Spacewatch || — || align=right | 2.2 km || 
|-id=705 bgcolor=#fefefe
| 167705 ||  || — || October 7, 2004 || Anderson Mesa || LONEOS || NYS || align=right data-sort-value="0.96" | 960 m || 
|-id=706 bgcolor=#fefefe
| 167706 ||  || — || October 8, 2004 || Anderson Mesa || LONEOS || — || align=right | 1.1 km || 
|-id=707 bgcolor=#fefefe
| 167707 ||  || — || October 6, 2004 || Kitt Peak || Spacewatch || FLO || align=right data-sort-value="0.83" | 830 m || 
|-id=708 bgcolor=#fefefe
| 167708 ||  || — || October 6, 2004 || Kitt Peak || Spacewatch || — || align=right data-sort-value="0.86" | 860 m || 
|-id=709 bgcolor=#fefefe
| 167709 ||  || — || October 6, 2004 || Kitt Peak || Spacewatch || — || align=right data-sort-value="0.96" | 960 m || 
|-id=710 bgcolor=#fefefe
| 167710 ||  || — || October 8, 2004 || Socorro || LINEAR || FLO || align=right data-sort-value="0.84" | 840 m || 
|-id=711 bgcolor=#fefefe
| 167711 ||  || — || October 7, 2004 || Kitt Peak || Spacewatch || — || align=right data-sort-value="0.90" | 900 m || 
|-id=712 bgcolor=#fefefe
| 167712 ||  || — || October 7, 2004 || Kitt Peak || Spacewatch || — || align=right | 1.2 km || 
|-id=713 bgcolor=#fefefe
| 167713 ||  || — || October 7, 2004 || Kitt Peak || Spacewatch || — || align=right data-sort-value="0.95" | 950 m || 
|-id=714 bgcolor=#fefefe
| 167714 ||  || — || October 7, 2004 || Kitt Peak || Spacewatch || MAS || align=right | 1.3 km || 
|-id=715 bgcolor=#fefefe
| 167715 ||  || — || October 8, 2004 || Kitt Peak || Spacewatch || NYS || align=right | 1.1 km || 
|-id=716 bgcolor=#fefefe
| 167716 ||  || — || October 8, 2004 || Kitt Peak || Spacewatch || — || align=right | 1.1 km || 
|-id=717 bgcolor=#fefefe
| 167717 ||  || — || October 9, 2004 || Kitt Peak || Spacewatch || — || align=right | 1.2 km || 
|-id=718 bgcolor=#fefefe
| 167718 ||  || — || October 9, 2004 || Kitt Peak || Spacewatch || — || align=right data-sort-value="0.82" | 820 m || 
|-id=719 bgcolor=#fefefe
| 167719 ||  || — || October 9, 2004 || Kitt Peak || Spacewatch || — || align=right data-sort-value="0.90" | 900 m || 
|-id=720 bgcolor=#fefefe
| 167720 ||  || — || October 11, 2004 || Kitt Peak || Spacewatch || EUT || align=right | 1.1 km || 
|-id=721 bgcolor=#fefefe
| 167721 ||  || — || October 15, 2004 || Kitt Peak || Spacewatch || — || align=right | 1.6 km || 
|-id=722 bgcolor=#fefefe
| 167722 ||  || — || October 10, 2004 || Kitt Peak || Spacewatch || FLO || align=right data-sort-value="0.68" | 680 m || 
|-id=723 bgcolor=#fefefe
| 167723 ||  || — || November 4, 2004 || Kitt Peak || Spacewatch || — || align=right data-sort-value="0.95" | 950 m || 
|-id=724 bgcolor=#fefefe
| 167724 ||  || — || November 7, 2004 || Socorro || LINEAR || — || align=right | 1.2 km || 
|-id=725 bgcolor=#fefefe
| 167725 ||  || — || November 3, 2004 || Kitt Peak || Spacewatch || — || align=right data-sort-value="0.95" | 950 m || 
|-id=726 bgcolor=#fefefe
| 167726 ||  || — || November 4, 2004 || Kitt Peak || Spacewatch || V || align=right | 1.1 km || 
|-id=727 bgcolor=#fefefe
| 167727 ||  || — || November 3, 2004 || Kitt Peak || Spacewatch || — || align=right data-sort-value="0.87" | 870 m || 
|-id=728 bgcolor=#fefefe
| 167728 ||  || — || November 10, 2004 || Kitt Peak || Spacewatch || — || align=right data-sort-value="0.83" | 830 m || 
|-id=729 bgcolor=#fefefe
| 167729 ||  || — || November 3, 2004 || Anderson Mesa || LONEOS || FLO || align=right data-sort-value="0.96" | 960 m || 
|-id=730 bgcolor=#fefefe
| 167730 ||  || — || November 19, 2004 || Kitt Peak || Spacewatch || — || align=right | 1.0 km || 
|-id=731 bgcolor=#fefefe
| 167731 ||  || — || December 1, 2004 || Catalina || CSS || V || align=right | 1.2 km || 
|-id=732 bgcolor=#fefefe
| 167732 ||  || — || December 1, 2004 || Catalina || CSS || — || align=right | 1.5 km || 
|-id=733 bgcolor=#fefefe
| 167733 ||  || — || December 8, 2004 || Socorro || LINEAR || NYS || align=right data-sort-value="0.97" | 970 m || 
|-id=734 bgcolor=#fefefe
| 167734 ||  || — || December 8, 2004 || Socorro || LINEAR || — || align=right | 1.2 km || 
|-id=735 bgcolor=#fefefe
| 167735 ||  || — || December 8, 2004 || Socorro || LINEAR || — || align=right | 2.0 km || 
|-id=736 bgcolor=#fefefe
| 167736 ||  || — || December 8, 2004 || Socorro || LINEAR || — || align=right | 1.2 km || 
|-id=737 bgcolor=#fefefe
| 167737 ||  || — || December 9, 2004 || Socorro || LINEAR || FLO || align=right | 1.2 km || 
|-id=738 bgcolor=#fefefe
| 167738 ||  || — || December 9, 2004 || Catalina || CSS || — || align=right | 1.4 km || 
|-id=739 bgcolor=#fefefe
| 167739 ||  || — || December 9, 2004 || Catalina || CSS || FLO || align=right data-sort-value="0.82" | 820 m || 
|-id=740 bgcolor=#fefefe
| 167740 ||  || — || December 9, 2004 || Catalina || CSS || NYS || align=right | 1.1 km || 
|-id=741 bgcolor=#fefefe
| 167741 ||  || — || December 10, 2004 || Socorro || LINEAR || — || align=right | 1.2 km || 
|-id=742 bgcolor=#fefefe
| 167742 ||  || — || December 9, 2004 || Catalina || CSS || ERI || align=right | 3.4 km || 
|-id=743 bgcolor=#fefefe
| 167743 ||  || — || December 10, 2004 || Socorro || LINEAR || — || align=right | 1.1 km || 
|-id=744 bgcolor=#E9E9E9
| 167744 ||  || — || December 11, 2004 || Kitt Peak || Spacewatch || — || align=right | 4.7 km || 
|-id=745 bgcolor=#E9E9E9
| 167745 ||  || — || December 11, 2004 || Kitt Peak || Spacewatch || — || align=right | 2.3 km || 
|-id=746 bgcolor=#fefefe
| 167746 ||  || — || December 2, 2004 || Kitt Peak || Spacewatch || NYS || align=right data-sort-value="0.94" | 940 m || 
|-id=747 bgcolor=#E9E9E9
| 167747 ||  || — || December 10, 2004 || Socorro || LINEAR || — || align=right | 2.0 km || 
|-id=748 bgcolor=#fefefe
| 167748 Markkelly ||  ||  || December 12, 2004 || Jarnac || Jarnac Obs. || MAS || align=right | 1.2 km || 
|-id=749 bgcolor=#fefefe
| 167749 ||  || — || December 10, 2004 || Anderson Mesa || LONEOS || FLO || align=right | 3.5 km || 
|-id=750 bgcolor=#fefefe
| 167750 ||  || — || December 10, 2004 || Socorro || LINEAR || FLO || align=right data-sort-value="0.73" | 730 m || 
|-id=751 bgcolor=#fefefe
| 167751 ||  || — || December 3, 2004 || Kitt Peak || Spacewatch || NYS || align=right | 1.1 km || 
|-id=752 bgcolor=#E9E9E9
| 167752 ||  || — || December 11, 2004 || Socorro || LINEAR || — || align=right | 1.6 km || 
|-id=753 bgcolor=#fefefe
| 167753 ||  || — || December 9, 2004 || Kitt Peak || Spacewatch || V || align=right | 1.0 km || 
|-id=754 bgcolor=#fefefe
| 167754 ||  || — || December 9, 2004 || Catalina || CSS || NYS || align=right | 1.5 km || 
|-id=755 bgcolor=#fefefe
| 167755 ||  || — || December 9, 2004 || Catalina || CSS || V || align=right | 1.1 km || 
|-id=756 bgcolor=#fefefe
| 167756 ||  || — || December 12, 2004 || Kitt Peak || Spacewatch || — || align=right | 1.3 km || 
|-id=757 bgcolor=#fefefe
| 167757 ||  || — || December 12, 2004 || Kitt Peak || Spacewatch || NYS || align=right | 1.1 km || 
|-id=758 bgcolor=#fefefe
| 167758 ||  || — || December 11, 2004 || Socorro || LINEAR || — || align=right | 1.7 km || 
|-id=759 bgcolor=#fefefe
| 167759 ||  || — || December 13, 2004 || Kitt Peak || Spacewatch || — || align=right | 1.2 km || 
|-id=760 bgcolor=#fefefe
| 167760 ||  || — || December 11, 2004 || Socorro || LINEAR || V || align=right | 1.2 km || 
|-id=761 bgcolor=#fefefe
| 167761 ||  || — || December 11, 2004 || Socorro || LINEAR || — || align=right | 1.5 km || 
|-id=762 bgcolor=#fefefe
| 167762 ||  || — || December 13, 2004 || Kitt Peak || Spacewatch || — || align=right | 1.3 km || 
|-id=763 bgcolor=#fefefe
| 167763 ||  || — || December 14, 2004 || Socorro || LINEAR || NYS || align=right | 1.3 km || 
|-id=764 bgcolor=#fefefe
| 167764 ||  || — || December 14, 2004 || Socorro || LINEAR || — || align=right | 1.0 km || 
|-id=765 bgcolor=#fefefe
| 167765 ||  || — || December 11, 2004 || Socorro || LINEAR || FLO || align=right data-sort-value="0.95" | 950 m || 
|-id=766 bgcolor=#fefefe
| 167766 ||  || — || December 15, 2004 || Kitt Peak || Spacewatch || NYS || align=right data-sort-value="0.92" | 920 m || 
|-id=767 bgcolor=#fefefe
| 167767 ||  || — || December 18, 2004 || Mount Lemmon || Mount Lemmon Survey || — || align=right | 1.2 km || 
|-id=768 bgcolor=#fefefe
| 167768 ||  || — || December 18, 2004 || Mount Lemmon || Mount Lemmon Survey || — || align=right data-sort-value="0.95" | 950 m || 
|-id=769 bgcolor=#fefefe
| 167769 ||  || — || December 18, 2004 || Mount Lemmon || Mount Lemmon Survey || — || align=right | 1.5 km || 
|-id=770 bgcolor=#fefefe
| 167770 ||  || — || December 16, 2004 || Anderson Mesa || LONEOS || V || align=right | 1.2 km || 
|-id=771 bgcolor=#fefefe
| 167771 ||  || — || January 1, 2005 || Catalina || CSS || V || align=right | 1.0 km || 
|-id=772 bgcolor=#E9E9E9
| 167772 ||  || — || January 6, 2005 || Catalina || CSS || — || align=right | 1.8 km || 
|-id=773 bgcolor=#fefefe
| 167773 ||  || — || January 6, 2005 || Catalina || CSS || — || align=right | 1.4 km || 
|-id=774 bgcolor=#fefefe
| 167774 ||  || — || January 6, 2005 || Catalina || CSS || NYS || align=right data-sort-value="0.90" | 900 m || 
|-id=775 bgcolor=#fefefe
| 167775 ||  || — || January 1, 2005 || Catalina || CSS || — || align=right | 1.5 km || 
|-id=776 bgcolor=#E9E9E9
| 167776 ||  || — || January 6, 2005 || Socorro || LINEAR || — || align=right | 1.8 km || 
|-id=777 bgcolor=#E9E9E9
| 167777 ||  || — || January 6, 2005 || Socorro || LINEAR || MAR || align=right | 1.9 km || 
|-id=778 bgcolor=#E9E9E9
| 167778 ||  || — || January 6, 2005 || Socorro || LINEAR || BRU || align=right | 5.4 km || 
|-id=779 bgcolor=#fefefe
| 167779 ||  || — || January 6, 2005 || Socorro || LINEAR || MAS || align=right | 1.2 km || 
|-id=780 bgcolor=#fefefe
| 167780 ||  || — || January 6, 2005 || Socorro || LINEAR || NYS || align=right | 1.2 km || 
|-id=781 bgcolor=#fefefe
| 167781 ||  || — || January 7, 2005 || Socorro || LINEAR || — || align=right | 1.4 km || 
|-id=782 bgcolor=#E9E9E9
| 167782 ||  || — || January 6, 2005 || Catalina || CSS || — || align=right | 2.9 km || 
|-id=783 bgcolor=#fefefe
| 167783 ||  || — || January 6, 2005 || Socorro || LINEAR || V || align=right | 1.0 km || 
|-id=784 bgcolor=#fefefe
| 167784 ||  || — || January 11, 2005 || Socorro || LINEAR || — || align=right | 1.3 km || 
|-id=785 bgcolor=#FA8072
| 167785 ||  || — || January 11, 2005 || Socorro || LINEAR || — || align=right | 1.3 km || 
|-id=786 bgcolor=#fefefe
| 167786 ||  || — || January 11, 2005 || Socorro || LINEAR || NYS || align=right | 1.6 km || 
|-id=787 bgcolor=#E9E9E9
| 167787 ||  || — || January 13, 2005 || Kitt Peak || Spacewatch || AGN || align=right | 1.9 km || 
|-id=788 bgcolor=#fefefe
| 167788 ||  || — || January 13, 2005 || Socorro || LINEAR || — || align=right | 1.4 km || 
|-id=789 bgcolor=#fefefe
| 167789 ||  || — || January 13, 2005 || Kitt Peak || Spacewatch || NYS || align=right | 2.6 km || 
|-id=790 bgcolor=#fefefe
| 167790 ||  || — || January 13, 2005 || Kitt Peak || Spacewatch || MAS || align=right | 1.2 km || 
|-id=791 bgcolor=#d6d6d6
| 167791 ||  || — || January 15, 2005 || Socorro || LINEAR || KOR || align=right | 2.3 km || 
|-id=792 bgcolor=#fefefe
| 167792 ||  || — || January 15, 2005 || Socorro || LINEAR || MAS || align=right | 1.2 km || 
|-id=793 bgcolor=#E9E9E9
| 167793 ||  || — || January 14, 2005 || Bergisch Gladbach || W. Bickel || — || align=right | 3.0 km || 
|-id=794 bgcolor=#E9E9E9
| 167794 ||  || — || January 13, 2005 || Kitt Peak || Spacewatch || HOF || align=right | 4.6 km || 
|-id=795 bgcolor=#fefefe
| 167795 ||  || — || January 13, 2005 || Kitt Peak || Spacewatch || NYS || align=right data-sort-value="0.98" | 980 m || 
|-id=796 bgcolor=#fefefe
| 167796 ||  || — || January 13, 2005 || Catalina || CSS || — || align=right | 1.8 km || 
|-id=797 bgcolor=#E9E9E9
| 167797 ||  || — || January 15, 2005 || Kitt Peak || Spacewatch || — || align=right | 2.4 km || 
|-id=798 bgcolor=#E9E9E9
| 167798 ||  || — || January 15, 2005 || Kitt Peak || Spacewatch || — || align=right | 3.3 km || 
|-id=799 bgcolor=#E9E9E9
| 167799 ||  || — || January 11, 2005 || Socorro || LINEAR || — || align=right | 2.4 km || 
|-id=800 bgcolor=#fefefe
| 167800 ||  || — || January 16, 2005 || Socorro || LINEAR || NYS || align=right | 1.1 km || 
|}

167801–167900 

|-bgcolor=#fefefe
| 167801 ||  || — || January 16, 2005 || Socorro || LINEAR || — || align=right | 1.3 km || 
|-id=802 bgcolor=#fefefe
| 167802 ||  || — || January 16, 2005 || Socorro || LINEAR || — || align=right | 1.9 km || 
|-id=803 bgcolor=#fefefe
| 167803 ||  || — || January 16, 2005 || Kitt Peak || Spacewatch || V || align=right | 1.1 km || 
|-id=804 bgcolor=#fefefe
| 167804 ||  || — || January 16, 2005 || Kitt Peak || Spacewatch || MAS || align=right | 1.1 km || 
|-id=805 bgcolor=#fefefe
| 167805 ||  || — || January 16, 2005 || Kitt Peak || Spacewatch || MAS || align=right | 1.3 km || 
|-id=806 bgcolor=#fefefe
| 167806 ||  || — || January 16, 2005 || Socorro || LINEAR || FLO || align=right data-sort-value="0.95" | 950 m || 
|-id=807 bgcolor=#E9E9E9
| 167807 ||  || — || January 16, 2005 || Socorro || LINEAR || — || align=right | 1.5 km || 
|-id=808 bgcolor=#E9E9E9
| 167808 ||  || — || January 16, 2005 || Socorro || LINEAR || HNA || align=right | 3.9 km || 
|-id=809 bgcolor=#fefefe
| 167809 ||  || — || January 16, 2005 || Socorro || LINEAR || — || align=right | 1.5 km || 
|-id=810 bgcolor=#E9E9E9
| 167810 ||  || — || January 16, 2005 || Kitt Peak || Spacewatch || HEN || align=right | 1.7 km || 
|-id=811 bgcolor=#fefefe
| 167811 ||  || — || January 18, 2005 || Catalina || CSS || NYS || align=right | 1.2 km || 
|-id=812 bgcolor=#E9E9E9
| 167812 || 2005 CG || — || February 1, 2005 || Goodricke-Pigott || R. A. Tucker || — || align=right | 4.3 km || 
|-id=813 bgcolor=#fefefe
| 167813 ||  || — || February 1, 2005 || Catalina || CSS || MAS || align=right | 1.6 km || 
|-id=814 bgcolor=#E9E9E9
| 167814 ||  || — || February 1, 2005 || Kitt Peak || Spacewatch || HEN || align=right | 1.7 km || 
|-id=815 bgcolor=#E9E9E9
| 167815 ||  || — || February 1, 2005 || Palomar || NEAT || — || align=right | 1.6 km || 
|-id=816 bgcolor=#E9E9E9
| 167816 ||  || — || February 1, 2005 || Kitt Peak || Spacewatch || — || align=right | 4.2 km || 
|-id=817 bgcolor=#E9E9E9
| 167817 ||  || — || February 1, 2005 || Kitt Peak || Spacewatch || RAF || align=right | 1.8 km || 
|-id=818 bgcolor=#E9E9E9
| 167818 ||  || — || February 1, 2005 || Catalina || CSS || MIS || align=right | 3.7 km || 
|-id=819 bgcolor=#fefefe
| 167819 ||  || — || February 1, 2005 || Palomar || NEAT || — || align=right data-sort-value="0.99" | 990 m || 
|-id=820 bgcolor=#E9E9E9
| 167820 ||  || — || February 1, 2005 || Catalina || CSS || — || align=right | 3.9 km || 
|-id=821 bgcolor=#fefefe
| 167821 ||  || — || February 1, 2005 || Catalina || CSS || MAS || align=right | 1.0 km || 
|-id=822 bgcolor=#fefefe
| 167822 ||  || — || February 1, 2005 || Catalina || CSS || ERI || align=right | 3.2 km || 
|-id=823 bgcolor=#E9E9E9
| 167823 ||  || — || February 2, 2005 || Socorro || LINEAR || — || align=right | 1.9 km || 
|-id=824 bgcolor=#fefefe
| 167824 ||  || — || February 2, 2005 || Socorro || LINEAR || — || align=right | 1.2 km || 
|-id=825 bgcolor=#d6d6d6
| 167825 ||  || — || February 2, 2005 || Catalina || CSS || — || align=right | 5.6 km || 
|-id=826 bgcolor=#fefefe
| 167826 ||  || — || February 2, 2005 || Catalina || CSS || — || align=right | 1.1 km || 
|-id=827 bgcolor=#E9E9E9
| 167827 ||  || — || February 1, 2005 || Kitt Peak || Spacewatch || — || align=right | 1.4 km || 
|-id=828 bgcolor=#fefefe
| 167828 ||  || — || February 1, 2005 || Palomar || NEAT || — || align=right | 1.8 km || 
|-id=829 bgcolor=#E9E9E9
| 167829 ||  || — || February 2, 2005 || Socorro || LINEAR || — || align=right | 1.6 km || 
|-id=830 bgcolor=#fefefe
| 167830 ||  || — || February 3, 2005 || Palomar || NEAT || — || align=right | 1.7 km || 
|-id=831 bgcolor=#fefefe
| 167831 ||  || — || February 2, 2005 || Socorro || LINEAR || — || align=right | 1.2 km || 
|-id=832 bgcolor=#E9E9E9
| 167832 ||  || — || February 2, 2005 || Catalina || CSS || — || align=right | 3.5 km || 
|-id=833 bgcolor=#d6d6d6
| 167833 ||  || — || February 2, 2005 || Kitt Peak || Spacewatch || HYG || align=right | 4.6 km || 
|-id=834 bgcolor=#E9E9E9
| 167834 ||  || — || February 2, 2005 || Kitt Peak || Spacewatch || — || align=right | 3.8 km || 
|-id=835 bgcolor=#fefefe
| 167835 ||  || — || February 2, 2005 || Kitt Peak || Spacewatch || NYS || align=right data-sort-value="0.94" | 940 m || 
|-id=836 bgcolor=#E9E9E9
| 167836 ||  || — || February 2, 2005 || Kitt Peak || Spacewatch || — || align=right | 3.6 km || 
|-id=837 bgcolor=#fefefe
| 167837 ||  || — || February 2, 2005 || Socorro || LINEAR || — || align=right | 1.8 km || 
|-id=838 bgcolor=#fefefe
| 167838 ||  || — || February 2, 2005 || Catalina || CSS || NYS || align=right | 1.2 km || 
|-id=839 bgcolor=#fefefe
| 167839 ||  || — || February 2, 2005 || Socorro || LINEAR || NYS || align=right | 2.8 km || 
|-id=840 bgcolor=#fefefe
| 167840 ||  || — || February 4, 2005 || Kitt Peak || Spacewatch || NYS || align=right | 1.1 km || 
|-id=841 bgcolor=#E9E9E9
| 167841 ||  || — || February 9, 2005 || Kitt Peak || Spacewatch || — || align=right | 3.5 km || 
|-id=842 bgcolor=#d6d6d6
| 167842 ||  || — || February 9, 2005 || Anderson Mesa || LONEOS || HYG || align=right | 4.3 km || 
|-id=843 bgcolor=#E9E9E9
| 167843 ||  || — || February 9, 2005 || Mount Lemmon || Mount Lemmon Survey || — || align=right | 1.7 km || 
|-id=844 bgcolor=#d6d6d6
| 167844 ||  || — || February 2, 2005 || Palomar || NEAT || — || align=right | 4.5 km || 
|-id=845 bgcolor=#fefefe
| 167845 ||  || — || February 2, 2005 || Catalina || CSS || — || align=right | 1.5 km || 
|-id=846 bgcolor=#fefefe
| 167846 ||  || — || February 2, 2005 || Catalina || CSS || — || align=right | 1.3 km || 
|-id=847 bgcolor=#fefefe
| 167847 ||  || — || February 2, 2005 || Palomar || NEAT || — || align=right | 2.2 km || 
|-id=848 bgcolor=#E9E9E9
| 167848 ||  || — || February 2, 2005 || Socorro || LINEAR || — || align=right | 2.3 km || 
|-id=849 bgcolor=#E9E9E9
| 167849 ||  || — || February 2, 2005 || Socorro || LINEAR || DOR || align=right | 4.1 km || 
|-id=850 bgcolor=#E9E9E9
| 167850 ||  || — || February 2, 2005 || Kitt Peak || Spacewatch || — || align=right | 2.4 km || 
|-id=851 bgcolor=#E9E9E9
| 167851 ||  || — || February 2, 2005 || Catalina || CSS || NEM || align=right | 3.5 km || 
|-id=852 bgcolor=#d6d6d6
| 167852 Maturana || 2005 DM ||  || February 17, 2005 || La Silla || A. Boattini, H. Scholl || EOS || align=right | 3.3 km || 
|-id=853 bgcolor=#E9E9E9
| 167853 || 2005 DN || — || February 26, 2005 || Gnosca || S. Sposetti || — || align=right | 2.4 km || 
|-id=854 bgcolor=#d6d6d6
| 167854 || 2005 ES || — || March 1, 2005 || Altschwendt || W. Ries || CHA || align=right | 3.9 km || 
|-id=855 bgcolor=#d6d6d6
| 167855 || 2005 ET || — || March 1, 2005 || Vicques || M. Ory || — || align=right | 4.9 km || 
|-id=856 bgcolor=#E9E9E9
| 167856 ||  || — || March 2, 2005 || Kitt Peak || Spacewatch || — || align=right | 2.0 km || 
|-id=857 bgcolor=#E9E9E9
| 167857 ||  || — || March 2, 2005 || Kitt Peak || Spacewatch || DOR || align=right | 5.0 km || 
|-id=858 bgcolor=#fefefe
| 167858 ||  || — || March 2, 2005 || Kitt Peak || Spacewatch || — || align=right | 1.3 km || 
|-id=859 bgcolor=#fefefe
| 167859 ||  || — || March 2, 2005 || Catalina || CSS || — || align=right | 1.4 km || 
|-id=860 bgcolor=#E9E9E9
| 167860 ||  || — || March 3, 2005 || Catalina || CSS || — || align=right | 2.0 km || 
|-id=861 bgcolor=#E9E9E9
| 167861 ||  || — || March 3, 2005 || Catalina || CSS || — || align=right | 1.3 km || 
|-id=862 bgcolor=#fefefe
| 167862 ||  || — || March 3, 2005 || Catalina || CSS || — || align=right data-sort-value="0.96" | 960 m || 
|-id=863 bgcolor=#E9E9E9
| 167863 ||  || — || March 3, 2005 || Catalina || CSS || — || align=right | 1.2 km || 
|-id=864 bgcolor=#d6d6d6
| 167864 ||  || — || March 3, 2005 || Catalina || CSS || — || align=right | 4.1 km || 
|-id=865 bgcolor=#fefefe
| 167865 ||  || — || March 3, 2005 || Catalina || CSS || — || align=right | 1.2 km || 
|-id=866 bgcolor=#fefefe
| 167866 ||  || — || March 3, 2005 || Catalina || CSS || — || align=right | 1.1 km || 
|-id=867 bgcolor=#d6d6d6
| 167867 ||  || — || March 3, 2005 || Catalina || CSS || — || align=right | 4.6 km || 
|-id=868 bgcolor=#E9E9E9
| 167868 ||  || — || March 3, 2005 || Catalina || CSS || — || align=right | 1.1 km || 
|-id=869 bgcolor=#d6d6d6
| 167869 ||  || — || March 3, 2005 || Catalina || CSS || — || align=right | 7.6 km || 
|-id=870 bgcolor=#E9E9E9
| 167870 ||  || — || March 3, 2005 || Catalina || CSS || — || align=right | 3.9 km || 
|-id=871 bgcolor=#fefefe
| 167871 ||  || — || March 3, 2005 || Catalina || CSS || MAS || align=right | 1.2 km || 
|-id=872 bgcolor=#d6d6d6
| 167872 ||  || — || March 3, 2005 || Catalina || CSS || — || align=right | 6.9 km || 
|-id=873 bgcolor=#d6d6d6
| 167873 ||  || — || March 3, 2005 || Catalina || CSS || EOS || align=right | 3.2 km || 
|-id=874 bgcolor=#d6d6d6
| 167874 ||  || — || March 3, 2005 || Catalina || CSS || — || align=right | 3.2 km || 
|-id=875 bgcolor=#fefefe
| 167875 Kromminga ||  ||  || March 2, 2005 || Calvin-Rehoboth || Calvin–Rehoboth Obs. || FLO || align=right | 1.1 km || 
|-id=876 bgcolor=#d6d6d6
| 167876 ||  || — || March 3, 2005 || Catalina || CSS || KOR || align=right | 2.4 km || 
|-id=877 bgcolor=#E9E9E9
| 167877 ||  || — || March 3, 2005 || Kitt Peak || Spacewatch || — || align=right | 1.7 km || 
|-id=878 bgcolor=#d6d6d6
| 167878 ||  || — || March 4, 2005 || Catalina || CSS || — || align=right | 3.2 km || 
|-id=879 bgcolor=#E9E9E9
| 167879 ||  || — || March 4, 2005 || Catalina || CSS || MAR || align=right | 1.7 km || 
|-id=880 bgcolor=#fefefe
| 167880 ||  || — || March 4, 2005 || Kitt Peak || Spacewatch || — || align=right | 1.0 km || 
|-id=881 bgcolor=#fefefe
| 167881 ||  || — || March 1, 2005 || Kitt Peak || Spacewatch || — || align=right | 1.2 km || 
|-id=882 bgcolor=#fefefe
| 167882 ||  || — || March 3, 2005 || Kitt Peak || Spacewatch || — || align=right | 1.0 km || 
|-id=883 bgcolor=#d6d6d6
| 167883 ||  || — || March 3, 2005 || Kitt Peak || Spacewatch || — || align=right | 5.1 km || 
|-id=884 bgcolor=#E9E9E9
| 167884 ||  || — || March 3, 2005 || Kitt Peak || Spacewatch || — || align=right | 1.1 km || 
|-id=885 bgcolor=#E9E9E9
| 167885 ||  || — || March 3, 2005 || Kitt Peak || Spacewatch || — || align=right | 3.8 km || 
|-id=886 bgcolor=#fefefe
| 167886 ||  || — || March 3, 2005 || Catalina || CSS || — || align=right | 1.1 km || 
|-id=887 bgcolor=#d6d6d6
| 167887 ||  || — || March 3, 2005 || Catalina || CSS || — || align=right | 3.1 km || 
|-id=888 bgcolor=#d6d6d6
| 167888 ||  || — || March 4, 2005 || Socorro || LINEAR || — || align=right | 3.7 km || 
|-id=889 bgcolor=#d6d6d6
| 167889 ||  || — || March 4, 2005 || Socorro || LINEAR || — || align=right | 5.2 km || 
|-id=890 bgcolor=#d6d6d6
| 167890 ||  || — || March 4, 2005 || Socorro || LINEAR || — || align=right | 3.0 km || 
|-id=891 bgcolor=#d6d6d6
| 167891 ||  || — || March 7, 2005 || Socorro || LINEAR || — || align=right | 4.7 km || 
|-id=892 bgcolor=#d6d6d6
| 167892 ||  || — || March 7, 2005 || Socorro || LINEAR || THM || align=right | 5.5 km || 
|-id=893 bgcolor=#d6d6d6
| 167893 ||  || — || March 7, 2005 || Socorro || LINEAR || — || align=right | 7.1 km || 
|-id=894 bgcolor=#fefefe
| 167894 ||  || — || March 4, 2005 || Socorro || LINEAR || PHO || align=right | 1.8 km || 
|-id=895 bgcolor=#E9E9E9
| 167895 ||  || — || March 2, 2005 || Catalina || CSS || AGN || align=right | 2.7 km || 
|-id=896 bgcolor=#E9E9E9
| 167896 ||  || — || March 3, 2005 || Kitt Peak || Spacewatch || — || align=right | 2.5 km || 
|-id=897 bgcolor=#E9E9E9
| 167897 ||  || — || March 3, 2005 || Catalina || CSS || — || align=right | 3.2 km || 
|-id=898 bgcolor=#d6d6d6
| 167898 ||  || — || March 3, 2005 || Catalina || CSS || — || align=right | 5.1 km || 
|-id=899 bgcolor=#d6d6d6
| 167899 ||  || — || March 3, 2005 || Catalina || CSS || EOS || align=right | 4.6 km || 
|-id=900 bgcolor=#E9E9E9
| 167900 ||  || — || March 4, 2005 || Kitt Peak || Spacewatch || — || align=right | 1.6 km || 
|}

167901–168000 

|-bgcolor=#E9E9E9
| 167901 ||  || — || March 4, 2005 || Catalina || CSS || — || align=right | 4.6 km || 
|-id=902 bgcolor=#E9E9E9
| 167902 ||  || — || March 8, 2005 || Socorro || LINEAR || — || align=right | 2.6 km || 
|-id=903 bgcolor=#E9E9E9
| 167903 ||  || — || March 8, 2005 || Anderson Mesa || LONEOS || — || align=right | 1.4 km || 
|-id=904 bgcolor=#E9E9E9
| 167904 ||  || — || March 8, 2005 || Kitt Peak || Spacewatch || JUN || align=right | 2.0 km || 
|-id=905 bgcolor=#fefefe
| 167905 ||  || — || March 3, 2005 || Catalina || CSS || — || align=right | 1.5 km || 
|-id=906 bgcolor=#E9E9E9
| 167906 ||  || — || March 3, 2005 || Catalina || CSS || — || align=right | 4.0 km || 
|-id=907 bgcolor=#d6d6d6
| 167907 ||  || — || March 3, 2005 || Catalina || CSS || — || align=right | 3.5 km || 
|-id=908 bgcolor=#fefefe
| 167908 ||  || — || March 3, 2005 || Catalina || CSS || — || align=right | 1.4 km || 
|-id=909 bgcolor=#E9E9E9
| 167909 ||  || — || March 3, 2005 || Catalina || CSS || — || align=right | 3.4 km || 
|-id=910 bgcolor=#E9E9E9
| 167910 ||  || — || March 3, 2005 || Catalina || CSS || — || align=right | 2.9 km || 
|-id=911 bgcolor=#d6d6d6
| 167911 ||  || — || March 3, 2005 || Catalina || CSS || — || align=right | 3.6 km || 
|-id=912 bgcolor=#fefefe
| 167912 ||  || — || March 3, 2005 || Catalina || CSS || ERI || align=right | 2.9 km || 
|-id=913 bgcolor=#d6d6d6
| 167913 ||  || — || March 3, 2005 || Catalina || CSS || — || align=right | 4.3 km || 
|-id=914 bgcolor=#E9E9E9
| 167914 ||  || — || March 3, 2005 || Kitt Peak || Spacewatch || — || align=right | 3.7 km || 
|-id=915 bgcolor=#E9E9E9
| 167915 ||  || — || March 4, 2005 || Catalina || CSS || — || align=right | 2.8 km || 
|-id=916 bgcolor=#d6d6d6
| 167916 ||  || — || March 4, 2005 || Catalina || CSS || EOS || align=right | 3.3 km || 
|-id=917 bgcolor=#E9E9E9
| 167917 ||  || — || March 4, 2005 || Mount Lemmon || Mount Lemmon Survey || — || align=right | 3.2 km || 
|-id=918 bgcolor=#E9E9E9
| 167918 ||  || — || March 4, 2005 || Socorro || LINEAR || — || align=right | 3.2 km || 
|-id=919 bgcolor=#E9E9E9
| 167919 ||  || — || March 7, 2005 || Socorro || LINEAR || — || align=right | 1.9 km || 
|-id=920 bgcolor=#E9E9E9
| 167920 ||  || — || March 7, 2005 || Socorro || LINEAR || EUN || align=right | 1.8 km || 
|-id=921 bgcolor=#E9E9E9
| 167921 ||  || — || March 7, 2005 || Socorro || LINEAR || EUN || align=right | 2.0 km || 
|-id=922 bgcolor=#d6d6d6
| 167922 ||  || — || March 8, 2005 || Kitt Peak || Spacewatch || EOS || align=right | 3.6 km || 
|-id=923 bgcolor=#E9E9E9
| 167923 ||  || — || March 9, 2005 || Kitt Peak || Spacewatch || — || align=right | 3.9 km || 
|-id=924 bgcolor=#E9E9E9
| 167924 ||  || — || March 9, 2005 || Mount Lemmon || Mount Lemmon Survey || XIZ || align=right | 2.0 km || 
|-id=925 bgcolor=#E9E9E9
| 167925 ||  || — || March 9, 2005 || Mount Lemmon || Mount Lemmon Survey || — || align=right | 1.6 km || 
|-id=926 bgcolor=#d6d6d6
| 167926 ||  || — || March 10, 2005 || Catalina || CSS || — || align=right | 4.2 km || 
|-id=927 bgcolor=#E9E9E9
| 167927 ||  || — || March 10, 2005 || Catalina || CSS || — || align=right | 2.3 km || 
|-id=928 bgcolor=#d6d6d6
| 167928 ||  || — || March 9, 2005 || Mount Lemmon || Mount Lemmon Survey || — || align=right | 4.3 km || 
|-id=929 bgcolor=#d6d6d6
| 167929 ||  || — || March 9, 2005 || Mount Lemmon || Mount Lemmon Survey || — || align=right | 4.9 km || 
|-id=930 bgcolor=#d6d6d6
| 167930 ||  || — || March 9, 2005 || Mount Lemmon || Mount Lemmon Survey || — || align=right | 3.3 km || 
|-id=931 bgcolor=#d6d6d6
| 167931 ||  || — || March 11, 2005 || Mount Lemmon || Mount Lemmon Survey || — || align=right | 5.5 km || 
|-id=932 bgcolor=#E9E9E9
| 167932 ||  || — || March 7, 2005 || Socorro || LINEAR || HNS || align=right | 1.9 km || 
|-id=933 bgcolor=#E9E9E9
| 167933 ||  || — || March 7, 2005 || Socorro || LINEAR || — || align=right | 3.7 km || 
|-id=934 bgcolor=#E9E9E9
| 167934 ||  || — || March 8, 2005 || Anderson Mesa || LONEOS || — || align=right | 2.3 km || 
|-id=935 bgcolor=#d6d6d6
| 167935 ||  || — || March 8, 2005 || Kitt Peak || Spacewatch || EOS || align=right | 2.6 km || 
|-id=936 bgcolor=#d6d6d6
| 167936 ||  || — || March 8, 2005 || Mount Lemmon || Mount Lemmon Survey || VER || align=right | 4.8 km || 
|-id=937 bgcolor=#d6d6d6
| 167937 ||  || — || March 8, 2005 || Mount Lemmon || Mount Lemmon Survey || URS || align=right | 5.0 km || 
|-id=938 bgcolor=#E9E9E9
| 167938 ||  || — || March 8, 2005 || Mount Lemmon || Mount Lemmon Survey || — || align=right | 1.6 km || 
|-id=939 bgcolor=#d6d6d6
| 167939 ||  || — || March 9, 2005 || Anderson Mesa || LONEOS || — || align=right | 5.0 km || 
|-id=940 bgcolor=#E9E9E9
| 167940 ||  || — || March 9, 2005 || Mount Lemmon || Mount Lemmon Survey || GEF || align=right | 2.1 km || 
|-id=941 bgcolor=#E9E9E9
| 167941 ||  || — || March 10, 2005 || Catalina || CSS || — || align=right | 1.6 km || 
|-id=942 bgcolor=#E9E9E9
| 167942 ||  || — || March 10, 2005 || Catalina || CSS || — || align=right | 3.3 km || 
|-id=943 bgcolor=#d6d6d6
| 167943 ||  || — || March 10, 2005 || Anderson Mesa || LONEOS || — || align=right | 7.2 km || 
|-id=944 bgcolor=#E9E9E9
| 167944 ||  || — || March 11, 2005 || Mount Lemmon || Mount Lemmon Survey || AGN || align=right | 1.7 km || 
|-id=945 bgcolor=#E9E9E9
| 167945 ||  || — || March 11, 2005 || Mount Lemmon || Mount Lemmon Survey || — || align=right | 3.2 km || 
|-id=946 bgcolor=#E9E9E9
| 167946 ||  || — || March 8, 2005 || Socorro || LINEAR || — || align=right | 2.9 km || 
|-id=947 bgcolor=#E9E9E9
| 167947 ||  || — || March 13, 2005 || Catalina || CSS || GEF || align=right | 2.1 km || 
|-id=948 bgcolor=#d6d6d6
| 167948 ||  || — || March 4, 2005 || Kitt Peak || Spacewatch || EOS || align=right | 3.0 km || 
|-id=949 bgcolor=#E9E9E9
| 167949 ||  || — || March 4, 2005 || Mount Lemmon || Mount Lemmon Survey || — || align=right | 2.5 km || 
|-id=950 bgcolor=#E9E9E9
| 167950 ||  || — || March 10, 2005 || Anderson Mesa || LONEOS || — || align=right | 2.4 km || 
|-id=951 bgcolor=#d6d6d6
| 167951 ||  || — || March 10, 2005 || Mount Lemmon || Mount Lemmon Survey || AEG || align=right | 6.5 km || 
|-id=952 bgcolor=#E9E9E9
| 167952 ||  || — || March 10, 2005 || Siding Spring || SSS || EUN || align=right | 2.2 km || 
|-id=953 bgcolor=#d6d6d6
| 167953 ||  || — || March 10, 2005 || Catalina || CSS || FIR || align=right | 6.0 km || 
|-id=954 bgcolor=#d6d6d6
| 167954 ||  || — || March 14, 2005 || Mount Lemmon || Mount Lemmon Survey || — || align=right | 4.4 km || 
|-id=955 bgcolor=#E9E9E9
| 167955 ||  || — || March 11, 2005 || Catalina || CSS || — || align=right | 3.6 km || 
|-id=956 bgcolor=#d6d6d6
| 167956 ||  || — || March 11, 2005 || Catalina || CSS || NAE || align=right | 5.5 km || 
|-id=957 bgcolor=#d6d6d6
| 167957 ||  || — || March 11, 2005 || Kitt Peak || Spacewatch || EOS || align=right | 6.0 km || 
|-id=958 bgcolor=#E9E9E9
| 167958 ||  || — || March 12, 2005 || Mount Lemmon || Mount Lemmon Survey || PAD || align=right | 4.8 km || 
|-id=959 bgcolor=#E9E9E9
| 167959 ||  || — || March 13, 2005 || Kitt Peak || Spacewatch || — || align=right | 1.4 km || 
|-id=960 bgcolor=#d6d6d6
| 167960 Rudzikas ||  ||  || March 13, 2005 || Moletai || K. Černis, J. Zdanavičius || TEL || align=right | 2.7 km || 
|-id=961 bgcolor=#E9E9E9
| 167961 ||  || — || March 11, 2005 || Mount Lemmon || Mount Lemmon Survey || — || align=right | 3.4 km || 
|-id=962 bgcolor=#d6d6d6
| 167962 ||  || — || March 13, 2005 || Kitt Peak || Spacewatch || — || align=right | 4.0 km || 
|-id=963 bgcolor=#E9E9E9
| 167963 ||  || — || March 14, 2005 || Mount Lemmon || Mount Lemmon Survey || — || align=right | 2.0 km || 
|-id=964 bgcolor=#d6d6d6
| 167964 ||  || — || March 8, 2005 || Anderson Mesa || LONEOS || — || align=right | 5.8 km || 
|-id=965 bgcolor=#E9E9E9
| 167965 ||  || — || March 8, 2005 || Anderson Mesa || LONEOS || — || align=right | 3.1 km || 
|-id=966 bgcolor=#d6d6d6
| 167966 ||  || — || March 9, 2005 || Anderson Mesa || LONEOS || — || align=right | 4.2 km || 
|-id=967 bgcolor=#d6d6d6
| 167967 ||  || — || March 9, 2005 || Socorro || LINEAR || EOS || align=right | 2.7 km || 
|-id=968 bgcolor=#d6d6d6
| 167968 ||  || — || March 9, 2005 || Mount Lemmon || Mount Lemmon Survey || — || align=right | 4.2 km || 
|-id=969 bgcolor=#E9E9E9
| 167969 ||  || — || March 13, 2005 || Mount Lemmon || Mount Lemmon Survey || — || align=right | 2.7 km || 
|-id=970 bgcolor=#d6d6d6
| 167970 ||  || — || March 10, 2005 || Catalina || CSS || EOS || align=right | 4.0 km || 
|-id=971 bgcolor=#d6d6d6
| 167971 Carlyhowett ||  ||  || March 11, 2005 || Kitt Peak || M. W. Buie || — || align=right | 4.6 km || 
|-id=972 bgcolor=#d6d6d6
| 167972 ||  || — || March 16, 2005 || Catalina || CSS || EOS || align=right | 3.4 km || 
|-id=973 bgcolor=#d6d6d6
| 167973 ||  || — || March 18, 2005 || Socorro || LINEAR || EOS || align=right | 3.7 km || 
|-id=974 bgcolor=#E9E9E9
| 167974 ||  || — || March 17, 2005 || Catalina || CSS || — || align=right | 1.4 km || 
|-id=975 bgcolor=#E9E9E9
| 167975 ||  || — || April 1, 2005 || Kitt Peak || Spacewatch || — || align=right | 2.2 km || 
|-id=976 bgcolor=#d6d6d6
| 167976 Ormsbymitchel ||  ||  || April 1, 2005 || Goodricke-Pigott || V. Reddy || HYG || align=right | 6.0 km || 
|-id=977 bgcolor=#E9E9E9
| 167977 ||  || — || April 1, 2005 || Anderson Mesa || LONEOS || — || align=right | 2.9 km || 
|-id=978 bgcolor=#d6d6d6
| 167978 ||  || — || April 4, 2005 || Desert Eagle || W. K. Y. Yeung || — || align=right | 5.1 km || 
|-id=979 bgcolor=#E9E9E9
| 167979 ||  || — || April 2, 2005 || Mount Lemmon || Mount Lemmon Survey || — || align=right | 2.0 km || 
|-id=980 bgcolor=#E9E9E9
| 167980 ||  || — || April 2, 2005 || Mount Lemmon || Mount Lemmon Survey || WIT || align=right | 1.4 km || 
|-id=981 bgcolor=#d6d6d6
| 167981 ||  || — || April 1, 2005 || Kitt Peak || Spacewatch || — || align=right | 5.3 km || 
|-id=982 bgcolor=#d6d6d6
| 167982 ||  || — || April 4, 2005 || Catalina || CSS || — || align=right | 4.8 km || 
|-id=983 bgcolor=#d6d6d6
| 167983 ||  || — || April 4, 2005 || Socorro || LINEAR || THM || align=right | 4.6 km || 
|-id=984 bgcolor=#E9E9E9
| 167984 ||  || — || April 2, 2005 || Siding Spring || SSS || RAF || align=right | 1.9 km || 
|-id=985 bgcolor=#d6d6d6
| 167985 ||  || — || April 5, 2005 || Kitt Peak || Spacewatch || — || align=right | 3.7 km || 
|-id=986 bgcolor=#E9E9E9
| 167986 ||  || — || April 2, 2005 || Mount Lemmon || Mount Lemmon Survey || — || align=right | 3.4 km || 
|-id=987 bgcolor=#E9E9E9
| 167987 ||  || — || April 3, 2005 || Palomar || NEAT || EUN || align=right | 2.0 km || 
|-id=988 bgcolor=#d6d6d6
| 167988 ||  || — || April 5, 2005 || Mount Lemmon || Mount Lemmon Survey || — || align=right | 4.5 km || 
|-id=989 bgcolor=#E9E9E9
| 167989 ||  || — || April 4, 2005 || Catalina || CSS || AGN || align=right | 1.8 km || 
|-id=990 bgcolor=#E9E9E9
| 167990 ||  || — || April 5, 2005 || Kitt Peak || Spacewatch || — || align=right | 2.1 km || 
|-id=991 bgcolor=#d6d6d6
| 167991 ||  || — || April 6, 2005 || Kitt Peak || Spacewatch || — || align=right | 3.7 km || 
|-id=992 bgcolor=#d6d6d6
| 167992 ||  || — || April 6, 2005 || Kitt Peak || Spacewatch || THM || align=right | 3.3 km || 
|-id=993 bgcolor=#d6d6d6
| 167993 ||  || — || April 9, 2005 || Mount Lemmon || Mount Lemmon Survey || — || align=right | 3.7 km || 
|-id=994 bgcolor=#E9E9E9
| 167994 ||  || — || April 10, 2005 || Mount Lemmon || Mount Lemmon Survey || EUN || align=right | 2.3 km || 
|-id=995 bgcolor=#E9E9E9
| 167995 ||  || — || April 11, 2005 || Kitt Peak || Spacewatch || — || align=right | 2.4 km || 
|-id=996 bgcolor=#E9E9E9
| 167996 ||  || — || April 12, 2005 || RAS || A. Lowe || — || align=right | 3.3 km || 
|-id=997 bgcolor=#d6d6d6
| 167997 ||  || — || April 10, 2005 || Mount Lemmon || Mount Lemmon Survey || — || align=right | 3.6 km || 
|-id=998 bgcolor=#d6d6d6
| 167998 ||  || — || April 11, 2005 || Kitt Peak || Spacewatch || EOS || align=right | 3.1 km || 
|-id=999 bgcolor=#d6d6d6
| 167999 ||  || — || April 7, 2005 || Socorro || LINEAR || EOS || align=right | 4.7 km || 
|-id=000 bgcolor=#d6d6d6
| 168000 ||  || — || April 10, 2005 || Kitt Peak || Spacewatch || — || align=right | 2.6 km || 
|}

References

External links 
 Discovery Circumstances: Numbered Minor Planets (165001)–(170000) (IAU Minor Planet Center)

0167